= National Register of Historic Places listings in Rice County, Minnesota =

Location of Rice County in Minnesota

This is a list of the National Register of Historic Places listings in Rice County, Minnesota. It is intended to be a complete list of the properties and districts on the National Register of Historic Places in Rice County, Minnesota, United States. The locations of National Register properties and districts for which the latitude and longitude coordinates are included below, may be seen in an online map.

There are 75 properties and districts listed on the National Register in the county, including two National Historic Landmarks. A supplementary list includes three additional sites that were formerly on the National Register.

This National Park Service list is complete through NPS recent listings posted July 31, 2026.

== Current listings ==
	Name on the Register	Image	Date listed	Location	City or town	Description
1	Administration Building-Girls' Dormitory, Minnesota School for the Deaf	Administration Building-Girls' Dormitory, Minnesota School for the Deaf	November 6, 1986 (#86003095)	615 Olof Hanson Dr. 44°17′51″N 93°15′35″W	Faribault	1912 Georgian Revival campus center designed by Clarence H. Johnston, Sr., exemplifying the monumental architecture used for Minnesota state social institutions.
2	All Saints Church–Episcopal	All Saints Church–Episcopal	April 6, 1982 (#82003027)	419 Washington St. 44°27′19″N 93°09′30″W	Northfield	Highly intact example, built 1866, of the small Gothic Revival churches built from Richard Upjohn's published designs during Henry Benjamin Whipple's episcopate.
3	W. Roby Allen Oral Home School	W. Roby Allen Oral Home School	July 12, 1990 (#90001091)	525 5th St. NE. 44°17′44″N 93°15′34″W	Faribault	1923 boarding school for the deaf founded by deaf education pioneer Bessie Blaker Allen.
4	Archibald Mill	Archibald Mill	October 8, 1976 (#76001071)	Railway St. 44°25′47″N 93°12′23″W	Dundas	1857 and 1870 gristmill ruins of a progressive milling family that pioneered hard spring wheat, patent flour, and roller mills in the United States. Their "Dundas Straight" was considered the best flour in the nation.
5	Edward T. Archibald House	Edward T. Archibald House	June 17, 1976 (#76001072)	200 2nd St. 44°25′34″N 93°12′16″W	Dundas	House occupied 1867–1885 by one of the Archibald Mill founders.
6	Ault Store	Ault Store	April 6, 1982 (#82003004)	206 2nd St. 44°25′43″N 93°12′10″W	Dundas	Last surviving commercial building of Dundas' original business district, built in 1866, and an example of Rice County's earliest commercial buildings.
7	Laura Baker School	Laura Baker School	March 29, 1978 (#78001560)	211 Oak St. 44°27′27″N 93°08′50″W	Northfield	Boarding school for students with intellectual disabilities, founded in 1898 by special education pioneer Laura Baker. Also notable for its retention of the original 1880s building's Queen Anne architecture. All original buildings razed.
8	Batchelder's Block	Batchelder's Block	July 12, 1990 (#90001089)	120 Central Ave. N. 44°17′31″N 93°16′07″W	Faribault	Faribault's second-oldest commercial building, built 1868; also noted for its exceptional Italianate architecture.
9	Frank A. and Elizabeth Berry House	Frank A. and Elizabeth Berry House	August 9, 1990 (#90001172)	319 3rd St. NW. 44°17′36″N 93°16′26″W	Faribault	1896 house designed by Olof Hanson, with transitional Queen Anne/Neoclassical architecture.
10	Bonde Farmhouse	Bonde Farmhouse	April 6, 1982 (#82003023)	16745 Minnesota Highway 246; 44°20′44″N 93°04′49″W	Nerstrand vicinity	1875 farmhouse of a prominent Norwegian immigrant family; also listed for its local limestone construction and historic integrity.
11	Bridge No. 8096	Bridge No. 8096	June 26, 1998 (#98000719)	Minnesota Highway 19 over Spring Creek; 44°27′51″N 93°09′14″W	Northfield	Unusual Gothic Revival masonry-veneer arch bridge stemming from a 1947 reconstruction of a 1914 bridge.
12	Cassius Buck House	Cassius Buck House	April 6, 1982 (#82003007)	124 1st Ave. SW. 44°17′19″N 93°16′14″W	Faribault	1895 house also known as "Buckeye", listed for its association with a notable local banker/politician and its Neoclassical architecture.
13	Thomas Scott Buckham Memorial Library	Thomas Scott Buckham Memorial Library	April 6, 1982 (#82003008)	11 Division St. 44°17′25″N 93°16′05″W	Faribault	1930 Moderne library significant as an exemplary public building of that decade, as the longtime home of Faribault Public Library, and as a memorial to a notable local leader.
14	Louis Carufel and E. LaRose House	Louis Carufel and E. LaRose House	August 3, 1990 (#90001160)	425 3rd St. SW. 44°17′13″N 93°16′32″W	Faribault	1877 Gothic Revival house of local limestone, two aspects rare in Faribault, though modified in an 1883 Italianate remodeling.
15	Cathedral of Our Merciful Saviour and Guild House	Cathedral of Our Merciful Saviour and Guild House	August 10, 1979 (#79001253)	515 2nd Ave. NW. 44°17′48″N 93°16′16″W	Faribault	Epicenter of the Episcopal Church in Minnesota and its first leader, Bishop Henry Benjamin Whipple, featuring an 1862 cathedral notably designed by James Renwick Jr. and an 1894 staff residence (added to listing February 19, 1982).
16	Chapel of the Good Shepherd	Chapel of the Good Shepherd	April 4, 1975 (#75001018)	At Shattuck School; 44°18′05″N 93°15′39″W	Faribault	Exemplary 1871 Gothic Revival church with medieval-style center-facing pews, designed by Henry Martyn Congdon for one of Bishop Henry Benjamin Whipple's first congregations, and the only surviving building from the original location of Whipple's Seabury Divinity School. Also a contributing property to the Shattuck Historic District.
17	Church of the Annunciation	Church of the Annunciation	April 6, 1982 (#82003033)	4996 Hazelwood Ave. 44°30′56″N 93°17′13″W	Webster Township	1913 church with an atypical American Craftsman design.
18	Church of the Holy Cross-Episcopal	Church of the Holy Cross-Episcopal	April 6, 1982 (#82003005)	205 2nd St. S. 44°25′33″N 93°12′14″W	Dundas	1868 church sponsored by milltown promoter John S. Archibald; also notable for its Gothic Revival architecture from Richard Upjohn's published designs.
19	Church of the Most Holy Trinity (Catholic)	Church of the Most Holy Trinity (Catholic)	November 13, 1997 (#97001424)	4938 N. Washington St. 44°30′57″N 93°27′37″W	Veseli	1905 church of a Catholic Czech American community.
20	Gordon Cole and Kate D. Turner House	Gordon Cole and Kate D. Turner House	August 3, 1990 (#90001150)	111 2nd St. NW. 44°17′32″N 93°16′14″W	Faribault	Circa-1856 house enlarged and embellished into one of Faribault's most elaborate frame Italianate residences.
21	Congregational Church of Faribault	Congregational Church of Faribault	May 12, 1977 (#77000768)	227 3rd St. NW. 44°17′36″N 93°16′22″W	Faribault	1867 stone Romanesque Revival church designed by Monroe Sheire for Rice County's oldest congregation, founded in 1856.
22	John N. and Elizabeth Taylor Clinton Cottrell House	John N. and Elizabeth Taylor Clinton Cottrell House	August 3, 1990 (#90001163)	127 1st St. NW. 44°17′28″N 93°16′15″W	Faribault	1897 frame house, the only surviving example of Stick style architecture in Faribault.
23	Den Svenska Evangeliska Lutherska Christdala Forsamlingen	Den Svenska Evangeliska Lutherska Christdala Forsamlingen	May 18, 1995 (#95000617)	4695 Millersburg Rd. 44°25′57″N 93°21′27″W	Lonsdale vicinity	1878 frame church of Rice County's first Swedish farming community, symbolizing the influence of the Swedish Lutheran Church and Swedish immigration in rural Minnesota.
24	Reverend James Dobbin House	Reverend James Dobbin House	July 23, 1990 (#90001090)	1800 14th St. NE. 44°18′41″N 93°15′51″W	Faribault	Exemplary 1874 Gothic Revival house of locally quarried limestone.
25	Dodd Road Discontiguous District	Dodd Road Discontiguous District	June 12, 2003 (#03000520)	Former County Rd. 61 (Circle Lake Tr., Falls Tr., Garfield Ave., and Groveland Tr.) between Millersburg and Shieldsville; 44°25′04″N 93°23′37″W	Lonsdale vicinity	6.8-mile (10.9 km) segment of a privately funded road built between Mendota and St. Peter in 1853, a key transportation artery in early south-central Minnesota. Two other segments lie in Le Sueur County.
26	Edwin S. Drake Farmhouse	Edwin S. Drake Farmhouse	April 6, 1982 (#82003028)	11188 County Highway 22; 44°25′32″N 93°09′44″W	Bridgewater Township	Circa-1863 brick house of a prominent early settler, also notable as a well-preserved example of the farmhouses of the area's American-born settlers.
27	Episcopal Rectory	Episcopal Rectory	August 9, 1990 (#90001171)	112 6th St. NW. 44°17′50″N 93°16′14″W	Faribault	1897 frame Colonial Revival rectory, Faribault's most intact structure designed by Olof Hanson.
28	Faribault City Hall	Faribault City Hall	April 6, 1982 (#82003010)	208 1st Ave. NW. 44°17′34″N 93°16′13″W	Faribault	Renaissance Revival municipal facility built 1984–97, associated with Faribault's emergence as a regionally important city and with a period of civic development across Minnesota.
29	Faribault Furniture Company	Faribault Furniture Company	July 8, 2019 (#100004146)	28 4th St. NE. 44°17′43″N 93°16′02″W	Faribault	1886 furniture factory with 1906 and 1913 additions, home of one of Faribault's most successful and economically significant industrial enterprises of the late 19th and early 20th centuries.
30	Faribault Historic Commercial District	Faribault Historic Commercial District	April 6, 1982 (#82003011)	Central Ave. and 2nd and 3rd Sts; also roughly bounded by 1st St. NW, 1st Ave. NE, 6th St. NW, and 1st Ave. NW; 44°17′35″N 93°16′06″W	Faribault	One-block central business district dating to Faribault's peak growth as a regional trade center. The 19 commercial buildings constructed between 1870 and 1898 are also notable for their Italianate and Queen Anne architecture. The second set of addresses represent a boundary increase approved May 28, 2021.
31	Faribault Viaduct	Faribault Viaduct	November 6, 1989 (#89001848)	Division St. over the Straight River; 44°17′27″N 93°15′53″W	Faribault	Exemplary 1937 reinforced-concrete bridge with Art Deco/Classical Revival ornamentation, one of the last major examples built in Minnesota. Also notable as a civic project linking a city divided by a river and rail corridor.
32	Faribault Water Works	Faribault Water Works	April 6, 1982 (#82003012)	824 7th St. NW. 44°17′54″N 93°16′57″W	Faribault	Pumping station juxtaposing two different eras of municipal water supply, with an 1883 building funded by a private company and later purchased by the city, and a 1938 building constructed by the Works Progress Administration as a federal project.
33	Faribault Woolen Mill Company	Faribault Woolen Mill Company	May 23, 2012 (#12000283)	1500 2nd Ave. NW. 44°18′25″N 93°16′21″W	Faribault	Minnesota's largest and longest-running woolen mill, beginning operations in 1892.
34	Alexander Faribault House	Alexander Faribault House	September 22, 1970 (#70000309)	12 1st Ave. NE. 44°17′28″N 93°16′01″W	Faribault	1853 Greek Revival house of influential fur trader Alexander Faribault; the first wood-frame house built in Rice County. Now managed by the Rice County Historical Society.
35	Farmer Seed and Nursery Company	Farmer Seed and Nursery Company	April 6, 1982 (#82003013)	818 4th St. NW. 44°17′42″N 93°16′56″W	Faribault	Seed warehouse expanded several times between 1899 and the 1920s, symbolizing Faribault's importance as an agricultural distribution center. Demolished in October 2022.
36	Goodsell Observatory--Carleton College	Goodsell Observatory--Carleton College	May 12, 1975 (#75001025)	301 Goodsell Cir. 44°27′43″N 93°09′09″W	Northfield	1887 observatory and official regional timekeeping station, also notable for its collection of vintage scientific equipment and association with astronomer William W. Payne.
37	M. P. Holman House	M. P. Holman House	August 3, 1990 (#90001162)	107 3rd Ave. NW. 44°17′30″N 93°16′22″W	Faribault	Circa-1875 brick Italianate house.
38	Hospital, State School for the Feeble Minded	Hospital, State School for the Feeble Minded	April 6, 1982 (#82003014)	Off 6th Ave. SE. 44°16′56″N 93°15′28″W	Faribault	1900 intellectual disability resource facility where pioneering psychologist A.R.T. Wiley had his laboratory. Likely demolished (see talk page).
39	John Hutchinson House	John Hutchinson House	April 6, 1982 (#82003015)	305 2nd St. NW. 44°17′32″N 93°16′24″W	Faribault	1892 frame Queen Anne house of a prosperous furniture factory owner. Now a bed and breakfast.
40	Johnston Hall-Seabury Divinity School	Johnston Hall-Seabury Divinity School	March 21, 1975 (#75001022)	633 1st St. SE. 44°17′21″N 93°15′26″W	Faribault	1888 Romanesque Revival library/faculty residence, nominated as the best surviving building of the Seabury Divinity School established by Bishop Henry Benjamin Whipple that produced many Episcopal leaders and missionaries. Demolished in 2021.
41	Vincent and Elizabeth Lieb House	Vincent and Elizabeth Lieb House	July 23, 1990 (#90001093)	201 4th Ave. SW. 44°17′18″N 93°16′27″W	Faribault	1862 vernacular limestone house.
42	Lonsdale Public School	Lonsdale Public School	August 30, 1979 (#79001254)	405 3rd Ave. SW. 44°28′40″N 93°25′54″W	Lonsdale	1908 public school notable for its role in local education and its juxtaposition of simple pattern architecture with ornate decoration. Now the 3R Landmark School Museum.
43	Drew H. Lord House	Drew H. Lord House	April 6, 1982 (#82003029)	201 E. 3rd St. 44°27′27″N 93°09′30″W	Northfield	1887 house of a prolific and successful local builder; also significant for its Eastlake movement architecture.
44	William Martin House	William Martin House	April 6, 1982 (#82003006)	107 1st St. N. 44°25′41″N 93°12′15″W	Dundas	1869 house dating to Dundas's economic peak as a regional milling center; also recognized for its transitional Greek Revival/Italianate architecture. Misspelled as Wiliam Martin House in NRHP database. Correct spelling is on nomination form.
45	Cormack McCall House	Cormack McCall House	August 3, 1990 (#90001149)	817 Ravine St. NE. 44°17′40″N 93°15′20″W	Faribault	Circa-1871 house of a prominent local stonemason, also an example of vernacular stone architecture used in Faribault's early working class homes.
46	Thomas McCall House	Thomas McCall House	August 3, 1990 (#90001159)	102 4th Ave. SW. 44°17′22″N 93°16′29″W	Faribault	One of Faribault's finest houses of local limestone, built for himself in 1868 by a notable local stonemason. Also recognized for its Italianate architecture from a 1908 remodelling.
47	Timothy J. McCarthy Building	Timothy J. McCarthy Building	August 3, 1990 (#90001161)	24 3rd St. NW. 44°17′38″N 93°16′10″W	Faribault	Ornate 1884 Italianate commercial building featuring Faribault's only polished marble façade.
48	Thomas and Bridget Shanahan McMahon House	Thomas and Bridget Shanahan McMahon House	July 19, 1990 (#90001112)	603 Division St. E. 44°17′26″N 93°15′31″W	Faribault	1871 vernacular stone house, a well-preserved example of Faribault's early working class homes.
49	Morristown Feed Mill	Morristown Feed Mill	June 17, 2019 (#100004074)	205 Bloomer St. E. 44°13′43″N 93°26′26″W	Morristown	1911 mill with circa 1931 and 1940 additions, associated with the adoption of scientifically designed animal feed. Now a museum.
50	Nerstrand City Hall	Nerstrand City Hall	April 6, 1982 (#82003024)	221 Main St. 44°20′30″N 93°04′04″W	Nerstrand	1908 city hall representative of Nerstrand's early growth, and Rice County's best example of municipal buildings of the early 20th century.
51	Northfield Commercial Historic District	Northfield Commercial Historic District	June 11, 1979 (#79003125)	Roughly bounded by S. Water, Division, Washington, 3rd, E. 4th, and W. 6th Sts., Dahomey Ave./TH 3; 44°27′23″N 93°09′39″W	Northfield	Four-block town center dating back to 1856 that preserves its historical mixed-use planning around a scenic riverway. A boundary decrease was approved on June 28, 2021.
52	Noyes Hall, State School for the Deaf	Noyes Hall, State School for the Deaf	May 12, 1975 (#75001020)	615 Olof Hanson Dr. 44°17′49″N 93°15′42″W	Faribault	Monumental deaf academy building constructed 1902–1910 with a Neoclassical rotunda, showing the emphasis placed on state-run special education institutions in Minnesota.
53	Jonathon L. and Elizabeth H. Wadsworth Noyes House	Jonathon L. and Elizabeth H. Wadsworth Noyes House	August 9, 1990 (#90001170)	105 1st Ave. NW. 44°17′30″N 93°16′10″W	Faribault	1896 Queen Anne/Shingle Style house designed by Olof Hanson, one of the most intact examples of his residential work.
54	John C. Nutting House	John C. Nutting House	October 15, 1970 (#70000310)	217 Union St. 44°27′28″N 93°09′24″W	Northfield	Northfield's only surviving large, brick house from the late 19th century, built 1887–8. Now the official residence for the president of Carleton College.
55	Old Main, Saint Olaf College	Old Main, Saint Olaf College	June 3, 1976 (#76001073)	St. Olaf College campus 44°27′34″N 93°10′49″W	Northfield	1877 campus center, symbol of a school founded by Norwegian Lutheran immigrants to provide education and preserve their heritage, also notable for its Gothic Revival architecture.
56	Osmund Osmundson House	Osmund Osmundson House	April 6, 1982 (#82003025)	Kielmeyer Ave. 44°20′38″N 93°03′54″W	Nerstrand	1880 house of the Norwegian immigrant homesteader who founded Nerstrand.
57	John Gottlieb Pfeiffer House	John Gottlieb Pfeiffer House	August 3, 1990 (#90001151)	931 3rd Ave. NW. 44°18′05″N 93°16′23″W	Faribault	1868 house of a prominent local stonemason, also an example of the vernacular stone architecture used in Faribault's working class homes.
58	Phelps Library, Shattuck School	Phelps Library, Shattuck School	April 4, 1975 (#75001021)	1000 Shumway Ave. 44°18′10″N 93°15′45″W	Faribault	1869 Gothic Revival library, oldest surviving building of an Episcopal boys' boarding school established by Bishop Henry Benjamin Whipple. Also a contributing property to the Shattuck Historic District.
59	Rice County Courthouse and Jail	Rice County Courthouse and Jail	April 6, 1982 (#82003016)	218 3rd St. NW. 44°17′38″N 93°16′17″W	Faribault	1934 Art Deco courthouse and 1910 brick jail, both replacements for earlier structures, showing the continuity and evolution of Rice County government buildings.
60	Rock Island Depot	Rock Island Depot	April 6, 1982 (#82003017)	311 Heritage Pl. 44°17′39″N 93°15′56″W	Faribault	1902 passenger depot that completed Faribault's rail network—securing its development as a regional trade center—and the best-preserved trackside facility of Rice County's rail towns.
61	O. E. Rolvaag House	O. E. Rolvaag House	August 4, 1969 (#69000078)	311 Manitou St. 44°27′46″N 93°10′21″W	Northfield	Home of author Ole Edvart Rølvaag from 1912 to his death in 1931, who portrayed the psychological cost of frontier life in novels like Giants in the Earth (1927).
62	Saint Mary's Hall	Saint Mary's Hall	April 6, 1982 (#82003019)	300 5th St. NE. 44°17′43″N 93°15′47″W	Faribault	1926 Gothic Revival school building designed by Clarence H. Johnston, Sr. for an Episcopal girls' boarding school established in 1866.
63	Scriver Block Building	Scriver Block Building	May 5, 1978 (#78001561)	408 Division St. S. 44°27′21″N 93°09′38″W	Northfield	Circa-1867 commercial building, site of the James-Younger Gang's failed bank robbery on September 7, 1876 that led to their downfall. Now a museum. Also a contributing property to the Northfield Commercial Historic District.
64	Scoville Memorial Library	Scoville Memorial Library	April 6, 1982 (#82003030)	105 College St. N. 44°27′36″N 93°09′22″W	Northfield	Built in 1896 as one of the first standalone libraries for a small Midwestern college, and one of the few original campus buildings left at Carleton College. Also noted for its Richardsonian Romanesque architecture.
65	Shattuck Historic District	Shattuck Historic District	April 6, 1982 (#82003018)	1000 Shumway Ave. 44°18′08″N 93°15′37″W	Faribault	Central campus of Faribault's prominent Episcopal schools, with 20 contributing properties built 1869–1957. Also noted for its Gothic Revival architecture.
66	Shumway Hall and Morgan Refectory-Shattuck School	Shumway Hall and Morgan Refectory-Shattuck School	April 4, 1975 (#75001023)	1000 Shumway Ave. 44°18′09″N 93°15′36″W	Faribault	1887 and 1888 campus buildings of a renowned boys' boarding school, further noted for their Romanesque/Gothic Revival architecture. Also a contributing property to the Shattuck Historic District.
67	Skinner Memorial Chapel	Skinner Memorial Chapel	April 6, 1982 (#82003031)	405 1st St. E. 44°27′37″N 93°09′17″W	Northfield	1916 chapel significant for its late Gothic Revival architecture and visual contribution to the Carlton College campus.
68	Steensland Library-Saint Olaf College	Steensland Library-Saint Olaf College	April 6, 1982 (#82003020)	Off Saint Olaf Ave. 44°27′35″N 93°10′50″W	Northfield	Built in 1902, a rare surviving building from St. Olaf College's early days; also a good example of Neoclassical architecture and early standalone college libraries.
69	Theopold Mercantile Co. Wholesale Grocery Building	Theopold Mercantile Co. Wholesale Grocery Building	April 6, 1982 (#82003021)	303 1st Ave. NE. 44°17′38″N 93°15′59″W	Faribault	1893 wholesale warehouse representing Faribault's importance as a regional distribution center.
70	Trondhjem Norwegian Lutheran Church	Trondhjem Norwegian Lutheran Church	September 7, 2001 (#01000945)	8501 Garfield Ave. 44°27′51″N 93°24′08″W	Lonsdale vicinity	1899 church and cemetery, a prominent hilltop symbol of the surrounding Norwegian American pioneer community.
71	Valley Grove	Valley Grove	April 6, 1982 (#82003026)	9999 155th St. E. 44°21′42″N 93°06′03″W	Nerstrand vicinity	Adjacent 1862 stone church and 1894 frame Gothic Revival church reflecting two phases of rural Norwegian American life in a dramatic hilltop tableau.
72	Thorstein Veblen Farmstead	Thorstein Veblen Farmstead	June 30, 1975 (#75001024)	Northeast of Nerstrand off Minnesota Highway 246; 44°20′53″N 93°02′49″W	Nerstrand vicinity	Circa-1875 family farm of influential social thinker Thorstein Veblen (1857–1929).
73	Adam Weyer Wagon Shop	Adam Weyer Wagon Shop	July 12, 1990 (#90001088)	32 2nd St. NE. 44°17′34″N 93°16′01″W	Faribault	1874 wagon and blacksmith shop, the most intact of Faribault's earliest stone industrial buildings.
74	Willis Hall	Willis Hall	June 13, 1975 (#75001026)	201 College St. N. 44°27′39″N 93°09′22″W	Northfield	Original building of Carleton College, built 1868–1872; also noted for its Second Empire architecture.
75	Hudson Wilson House	Hudson Wilson House	April 6, 1982 (#82003022)	104 1st Ave. NW. 44°17′30″N 93°16′13″W	Faribault	1876 Second Empire house of an influential civic leader in early Faribault.

== Former listings ==
	Name on the Register	Image	Date listed	Date removed	Location	City or town	Description
1	Blind Department Building and Dow Hall, State School for the Blind	Blind Department Building and Dow Hall, State School for the Blind	July 25, 1990 (#90001092)	November 7, 2016	400 6th Ave. SE. 44°17′12″N 93°15′36″W	Faribault	1874 and 1883 buildings of the State School for the Blind, one of Minnesota's four early state-funded special education institutions. Dow Hall was demolished and marked with a memorial.
2	Church of St. Patrick-Catholic		April 6, 1982 (#82003032)	June 11, 2003	County Hwy. 10 (Dodd Road)	Faribault vicinity	1888 church of Minnesota's first Irish immigrant community. Burned down in 2002.
3	Dump Road Bridge		November 6, 1989 (#89001835)	July 1, 2002	Twp. Road 45 over Straight River	Faribault vicinity	Exemplified a common style of Pratt through truss bridges and the work of notable Minnesotan bridge contractor A.Y. Bayne. Demolished in 2001.

== See also ==
- List of National Historic Landmarks in Minnesota
- National Register of Historic Places listings in Minnesota
