= Valley Grove (Wheeling Township, Minnesota) =

Historic church complex in Minnesota, United States

- U.S. National Register of Historic Places
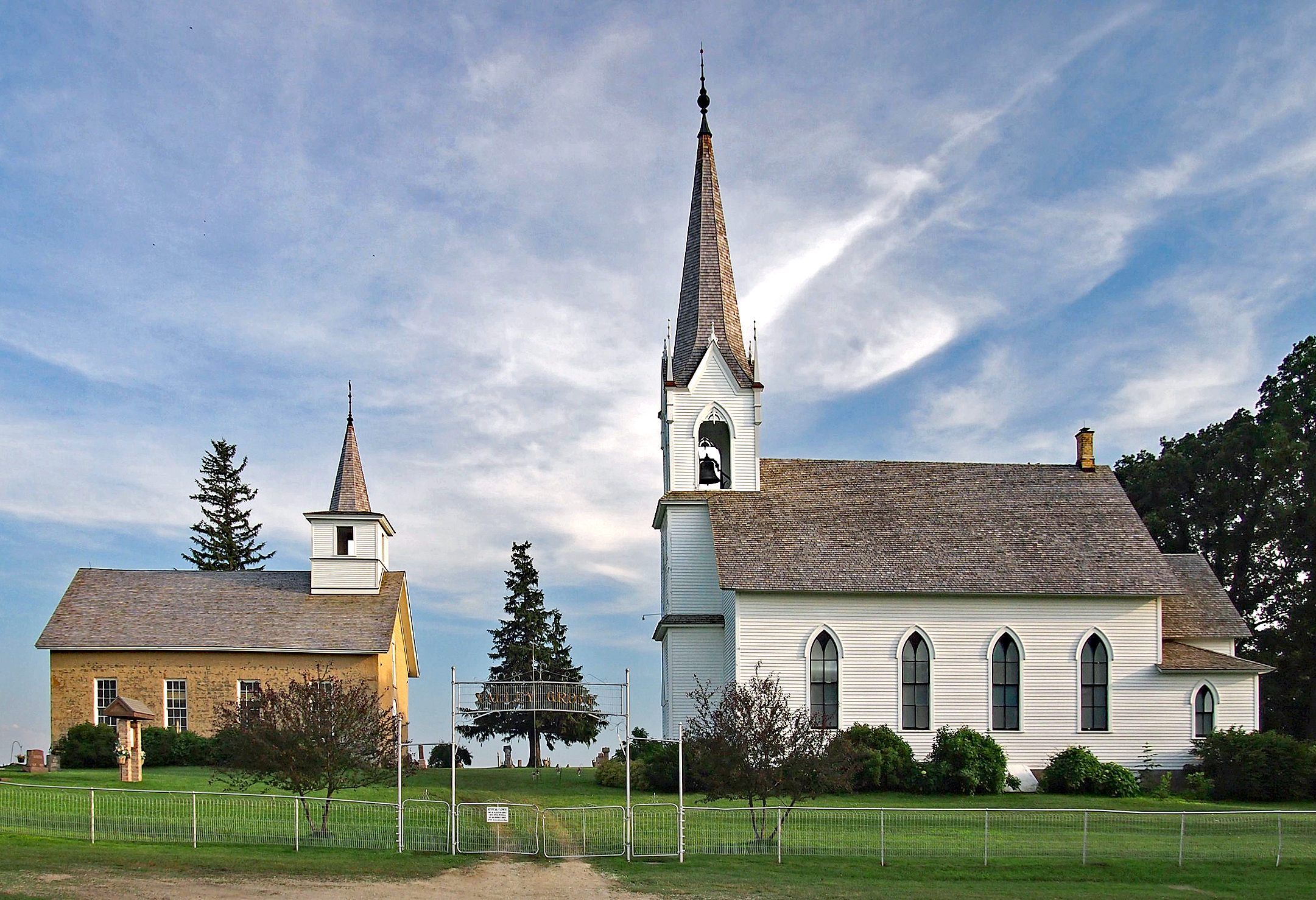
- Valley Grove viewed from the north

- Location within Minnesota Location within the United States
- Location: 9999 155th Street E, Wheeling Township, Minnesota
- Coordinates: 44°21′42″N 93°6′3″W
- Area: 1.9 acres (0.77 ha)
- Built: 1862, 1894
- Architectural style: Greek Revival, Carpenter Gothic
- MPS: Rice County MRA
- NRHP reference No.: 82003026
- Added to NRHP: April 6, 1982

Valley Grove is a historic Lutheran church complex in Wheeling Township, Minnesota, United States. It consists of two 19th-century churches surrounded by a hilltop cemetery. The older building was constructed in stone in 1862 by a rural community of Norwegian immigrants. The congregation outgrew the first church and constructed a larger, wooden replacement in 1894, converting the original building into a guild hall. The property was listed on the National Register of Historic Places in 1982 for its local significance in the themes of architecture, art, and religion. It was nominated for encapsulating two phases of rural ecclesiastical architecture in a dramatic hilltop tableau, and for its role in anchoring eastern Rice County's dispersed community of Norwegian immigrants.

== First church ==
Valley Grove Church traces its beginnings to the mid-1850s, when Norwegian immigrants in a settlement alternately called Tyske Grove or German Grove (only later Valley Grove) first held religious services in their log homes and outdoors. As early as 1860, meetings were held to discuss erecting a church three miles (4.8 km) northwest of Nerstrand, Minnesota. Pastor Bernt Julius Muus had baptized 52 children under an oak tree on the site in 1859. The land's owner, Fingal Fingalson, would not commit to selling. According to lore, "one day Ole Rudningen happened to meet him, so he asked him outright if the land was for sale or not. Fingalson said it was, so to close the deal then and there, Ole reached in his pocket and took out fifty cents—the only money he had, and paid it to close the deal".

One of the limestone quarries in what is now Nerstrand-Big Woods State Park provided the stone for the Valley Grove Church, a short distance away. Construction was completed in 1862. Situated on a hilltop, facing west, the rectangular church with a gable roof measures 55 by 35 feet (17 by 11 m) and 20 feet (6.1 m) high. The total cost was $1,200 (equivalent to $38,700 in 2025). Simple in design, the building has four regularly spaced windows on the north and south walls.

From 1862 to 1867, Valley Grove operated as an independent congregation until joining the Synod of the Norwegian Evangelical Lutheran Church in America. The following year the church was officially dedicated on October 18, 1868. In 1874, a church bell weighing 1,433 pounds (650 kg) was purchased for $568 (equivalent to $16,163 in 2025) from the Troy Bell Foundry of Troy, New York.

== Second church ==
By 1894 the burgeoning congregation had outgrown the stone church. Members who lived in Nerstrand lobbied for a church to be built within village limits. To appease the congregation, two identical wood-frame churches with high steeples were erected; one in Nerstrand (later named Grace Lutheran Church) and the other, known as the Valley Grove "West" Lutheran Church, facing east, 75 feet (23 m) away from the old stone church. The total cost to build both the West Church and Grace Lutheran Church was $2,975 (equivalent to $110,704 in 2025). The former was dedicated on November 8, 1894. Its white clapboard, Gothic-inspired look boasted ornamental pinnacles and pointed arches. Again, local quarried rock was utilized for the foundation. Like the stone church, plumbing was not installed.

The juxtaposition of the old limestone church and the new church perched on the grassy knoll created a dramatic panorama. The bell was transferred from the stone church and placed in the steeple of the new church. The following year, in 1895, the former church was transformed into a guild hall managed by its Ladies' Aid Society. The ceiling was lowered and a kitchen was built in the rear of the building.

In 1949 the two churches of the Valley Grove Congregation—one in town and the other here amid farm country—officially divided and became independent of each other. Both churches remained in the same parish.

== Later history ==
By the early 1970s, the West Church congregation's numbers had declined considerably. The few remaining members made the hard decision on April 17, 1972, to disband the following year. In May 1975 the West Church and grounds were officially transferred to the Society for the Preservation of Valley Grove Church (later renamed the Valley Grove Preservation Society). The old stone church and cemetery were transferred to the Valley Grove-Grace Cemetery Association. In 1982, the site was placed on the National Register of Historic Places.

The Valley Grove Preservation Society obtained a 50-year lease on the 1862 building from the Valley Grove Grace Cemetery Association in 2007. In subsequent years, the church has received a new steeple roof, finials, exterior repairs, and painting. This project has been financed in part with Minnesota Historical and Cultural Heritage Grants provided by the state through the Minnesota Historical Society.

As of 2020, the Valley Grove Preservation Society seeks to maintain the two historic churches, cemetery, and surrounding grounds, including restoration of a 50-acre (20 ha) oak savanna. As a place to gather, Valley Grove continues to host weddings, funerals, an annual candlelight Christmas Eve service, and other social functions, such as the annual Valley Grove Country social.

== See also ==
- List of Lutheran churches
- National Register of Historic Places listings in Rice County, Minnesota
