= Bonde Farmhouse =

Historic house in Minnesota, United States

- U.S. National Register of Historic Places
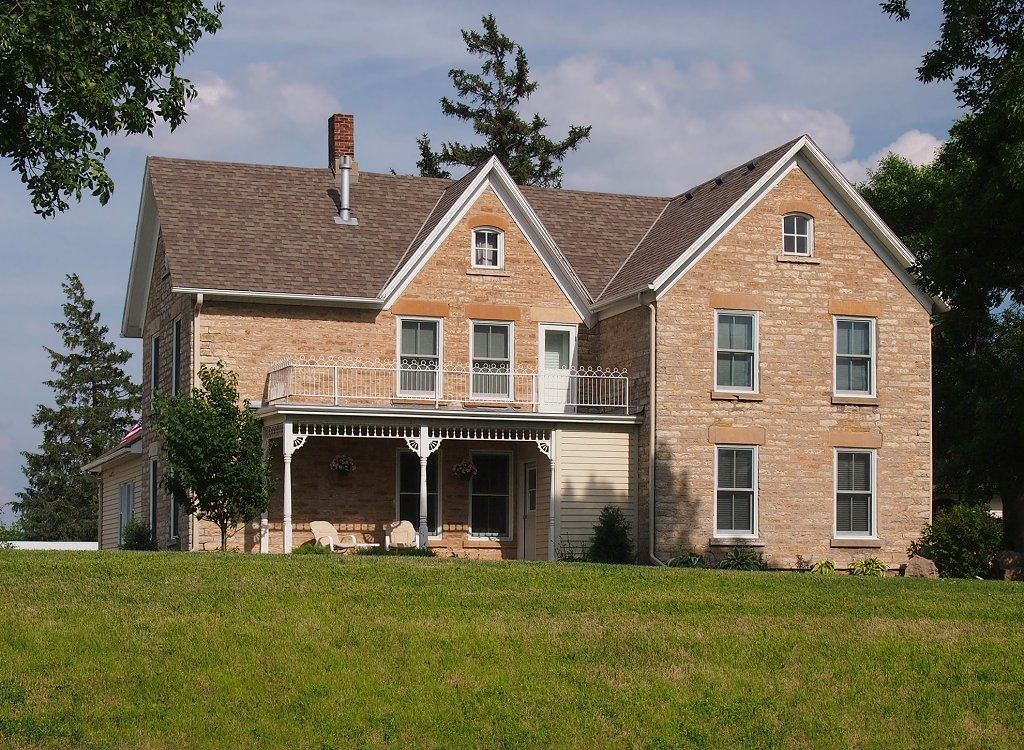
- The Bonde Farmhouse from the west-northwest

- Location within Minnesota Location within the United States
- Nearest city: Nerstrand, Minnesota
- Coordinates: 44°20′43″N 93°4′46″W
- Area: 2.4 acres (0.97 ha)
- Built: 1875
- MPS: Rice County MRA
- NRHP reference No.: 82003023
- Added to NRHP: April 6, 1982

The Bonde Farmhouse is a historic farmhouse located in Wheeling Township in Rice County, Minnesota, United States, approximately 1 mile (1.6 km) from Nerstrand. The private home was placed on the National Register of Historic Places (NRHP) on April 6, 1982. The farmhouse is significant both for its association with a prominent Norwegian immigrant family as well as its local limestone construction and outstanding integrity.

== Structure ==
The Bonde Farmhouse is located off County Road 27 and Minnesota State Highway 246, just outside the town of Nerstrand. The building's siting on a hilltop location, alongside its stone masonry construction, make it a focal point for the farmstead and landmark in the area. The 2 1/2-story house is constructed of Nerstrand and Faribault limestone and its two sections form an L-shape. All windows and door opening on the west (front) side of the north ell are located below the central cabled roof while wider spaces are located between other openings. The two-over-two windows have stone sills and lintels. Small, slightly arched windows are centered in the gable ends. The front porch features turned posts, turned brackets and spindles along the porch frieze and is topped by a metal railing; it extends across the west side of the north ell. In 1960 a basement garage and 1-story addition were added to the rear of the building.

Four of the farm buildings located near the house comprise the core of structures built by Tosten Bonde during the 1870s and 1880s; Bonde's journal recorded the construction dates. These structures include a gambrel-roofed barn, built in 1870 and remodeled at the turn of the 20th century; an 1883 machine shed that was later turned to a garage; an 1886 granary; and an 1887 milk house. These buildings were included in the original nomination to the NRHP.

== History and significance ==
The site was originally homesteaded by Einer Bonde, who emigrated from Norway with his family in 1854 to farm in the Midwest. After a year in Iowa, in 1855 the family settled among the loosely organized Norwegian settlers in Wheeling Township. Einer's son Tosten acquired the farm in 1865 and built the large farmhouse in 1875, the same year his father, Einer died. Tosten Bonde kept thorough records of farm statistics, building improvements and family and local notes in a journal he kept in the 1880s. Tosten Bonde was a successful farmer and figured prominently in the history of the Norwegian community centered on Nerstrand. He founded the Wheeling Mutual Insurance Company in 1876 and served in the Minnesota State Legislature for two terms as a Representative and two terms as a State Senator.

The Bonde Farmhouse reflects the success of early Norwegian farmers who cleared and farmed the land of the area. The area surrounding Nerstrand and Wheeling Township became a close-knit Norwegian American community. At the time of its listing on the NRHP, Bonde family descendants still headed the Wheeling Mutual Insurance Company, farmed the original homestead and resided in the stone house.

== See also ==
- Thorstein Veblen Farmstead
- Osmund Osmundson House
