= Big Woods =

Type of temperate hardwood forest

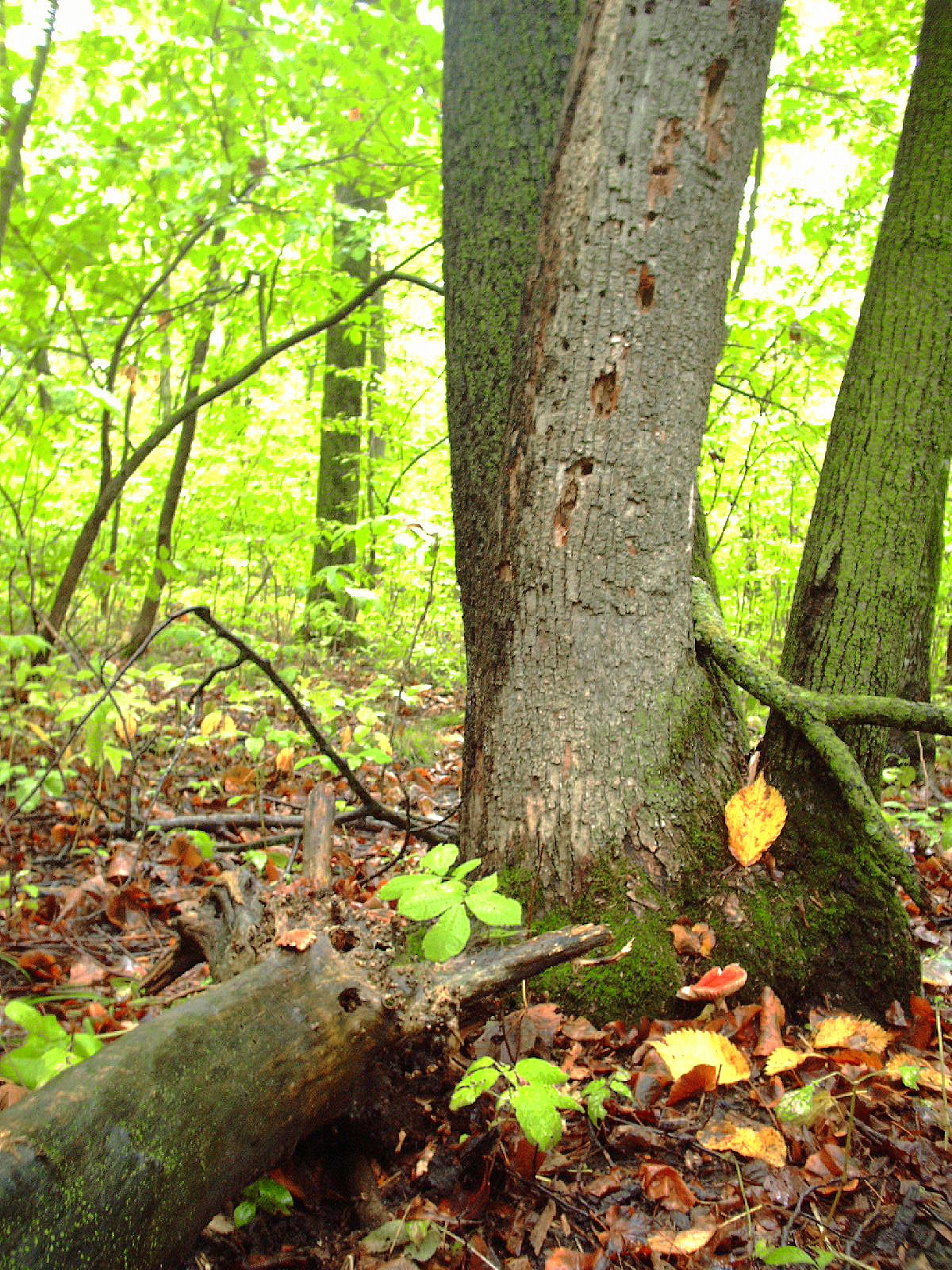
- Trees in the Big Woods

Geography
- Country: United States
- State: Minnesota and Wisconsin
- Rivers: Minnesota and Crow
- Soil types: Thick glacial till of crushed limestone

Map of Minnesota ecoregions, with the centrally-located Big Woods in aqua

Big Woods refers to a type of temperate hardwood forest ecoregion found in western Wisconsin and south-central Minnesota. "Big Woods" is a direct translation of the name given to the region by French explorers: Grand Bois. The theory of its origins maintains the ecosystem was formed 300 to 600 years ago in the protection "of topographic and water-based firebreaks during a period of cooler and moister climate".

== Trees and native vegetation ==
The dominant trees are American elm, basswood, sugar maple, and red oak. The understory is composed of ironwood, green ash, and aspen. The Big Woods would have once covered 5,000 square miles (13,000 km^{2}) in a diagonal strip 100 miles (160 km) long and 40 miles (64 km) wide. Today most of this region has been cleared for agriculture and urban development. Remnant and secondary stands of Big Woods remain in parks and other protected areas. Native vegetation based on soils information (note the bright green color) from the Natural Resources Conservation Service of the United States Department of Agriculture shows the historic extent of oak savannas in the Big Woods region (See accompanying pie chart, below).

Big Woods Counties native vegetation based on NRCS soils information

== Ecology ==
The soil of the Big Woods is thick glacial till of crushed limestone, deposited by the Des Moines lobe of the Wisconsin glaciation 10,000 years ago. The landscape is characterized by round hills and numerous undrained lakes left by melting ice blocks. These hills and lakes suppressed fires that were instrumental forces on the prairie to the west and the oak savanna to the south and east. The Minnesota and Crow Rivers flow through the region, but many of the 100 or so lakes had no inlets or outlets.

The Big Woods have a growing season of about 145–150 days and an average annual precipitation of 30 inches (760 mm).

== Preservation ==
A fragment of the Big Woods in mostly pristine condition is preserved in Nerstrand-Big Woods State Park near Nerstrand, Minnesota.

== In culture ==
Little House in the Big Woods by American author Laura Ingalls Wilder takes place near her home town of Pepin, Wisconsin.
