= Nerstrand City Hall =

- U.S. National Register of Historic Places
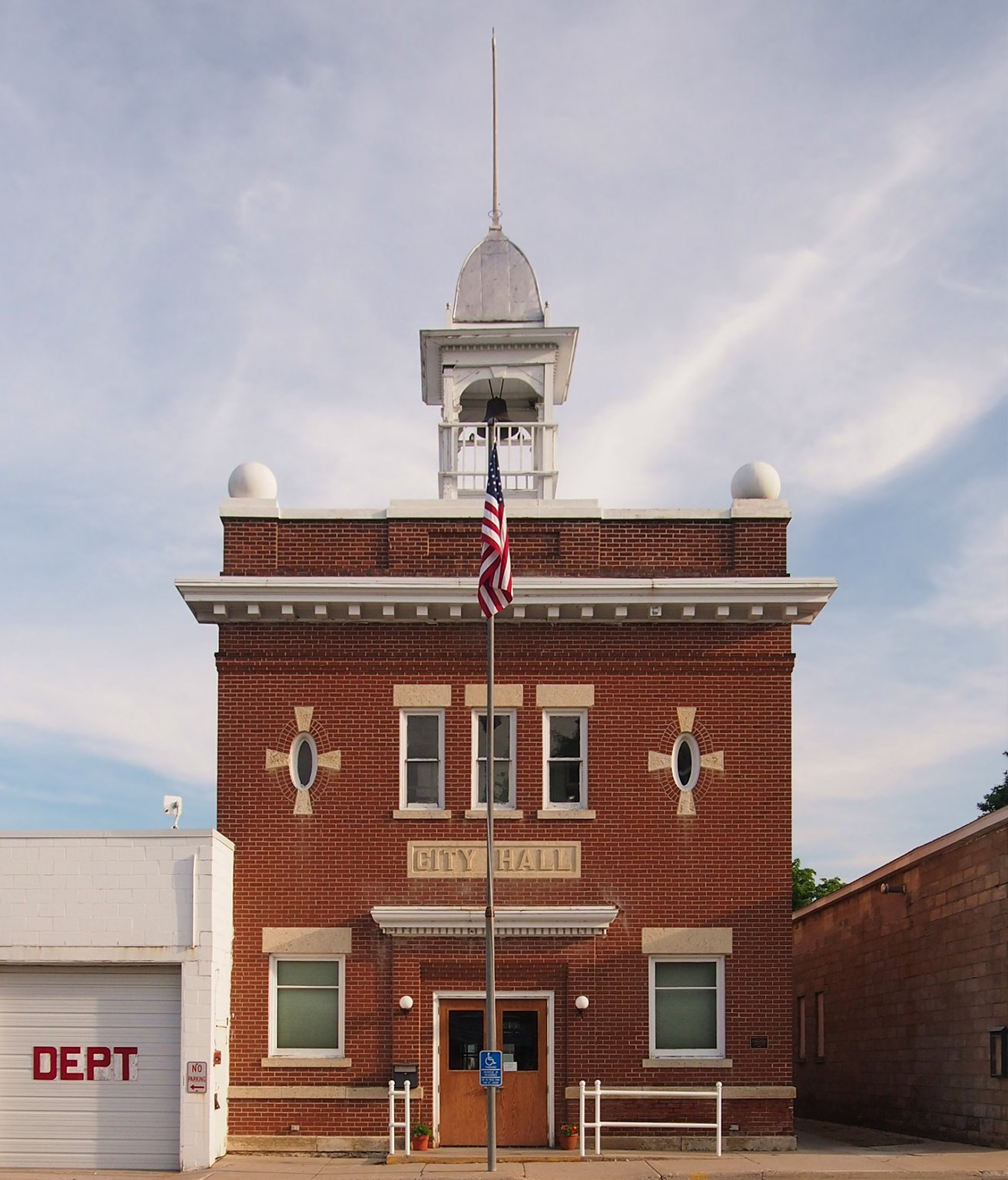
- Nerstrand City Hall from the north

- Location within Minnesota Location within the United States
- Location: 221 Main Street, Nerstrand, Minnesota
- Coordinates: 44°20′30″N 93°4′4.4″W
- Area: Less than one acre
- Built: 1908
- Architect: Thori, Alban, & Fisher
- MPS: Rice County MRA
- NRHP reference No.: 82003024
- Added to NRHP: April 06, 1982

Nerstrand City Hall is a historic city hall building in Nerstrand, Minnesota, United States, constructed in 1908. It was listed on the National Register of Historic Places (NRHP) on April 6, 1982, for having local significance in the theme of politics/government. It was nominated for being representative of Nerstrand's early growth, and for being Rice County's best example of municipal buildings of the early 20th century.

== Structure ==
Nerstrand City Hall is a two-story red brick building located in the small community of Nerstrand. Located on the south side of Main Street, it is the most architecturally distinctive building in the community.

Designed by the St. Paul firm of Thori, Alban, & Fisher, it was constructed in 1908. It features a symmetrical facade and is capped by a wood cornice with modillion blocks and a central bell tower. The central bay features a double doorway framed by brick pilaster strips and dentillated wood cornice. The main door is flanked by large two part windows with stone sills and headers. A large stone bearing the words "CITY HALL" separates the door from three rectilinear windows in the second story bay; these are flanked by small oval windows. The open bell tower shelters a bell and features a dentillated cornice and domed roof capped by a flagpole. Spherical finials flank the bell tower at the corners of the building.

== History and significance ==
The city of Nerstrand traces its history to the 1870s, but the town was not platted until the Chicago Great Western Railway reached the area in 1885. It incorporated in 1897. The area surrounding Nerstrand and Wheeling Township were formed from a close-knit Norwegian American community. The turn of the 20th century was a period of maturation for Rice County, characterized by various civic improvements, city halls, water systems, etc. Nerstrand's first city hall, built at the time of incorporation, proved too small within a few years. A lot was purchased for the new building in 1907 and it was finished the following year.

The ground floor of Nerstrand's City Hall originally housed city offices, fire equipment and a jail; and a large community room occupies the second floor. A new fire station was built adjacent to the structure in the 1980s. At the time the building was listed on the NRHP, it was being used as the public library.

The building is significant for its association with Nerstrand's early growth as well as being one of Rice County's best examples of the municipal buildings that were constructed in the first decades of the twentieth century. It reflects a period of increased civic-mindedness and prosperity.

== See also ==
- List of city and town halls in the United States
- National Register of Historic Places listings in Rice County, Minnesota
