= Osmundson =

Osmundson is a surname. Notable people with the surname include:

- Anne Osmundson (born 1957), American politician from Iowa
- Joseph Osmundson (born 1983), American biophysicist
- Ryan Osmundson, American politician from Montana

== Other ==
- Osmund Osmundson House, historic house in Nerstrand, Minnesota, US
