= Brusletten =

Brusletten is a surname. Notable people with the surname include:

- C. L. Brusletten (1853–1929), Norwegian-born American banker, businessman, and politician
- Reidun Brusletten (born 1936), Norwegian politician
