= Rolvaag =

Rølvaag, Rølvåg or Rolvaag is a Norwegian surname. Notable people with the surname include:

- Karl Rolvaag (1913–1990), American politician, son of Ole
- Mette Henriette Martedatter Rølvåg (born 1990), Norwegian musician
- Ole Edvart Rølvaag (1876–1931), American author
  - O. E. Rolvaag House, home of Ole Edvart
- Sander Rølvåg (born 1990), Norwegian curler
