= Kenyon Public Library =

Public library in Kenyon, Minnesota, the United States

- 44.2722222°N 92.9850000°W
- Location: 709 2nd Street; Kenyon, MN 55946

Other information
- Director: Michelle Otte
- Employees: 3
- Website: http://www.kenyon.lib.mn.us

The Kenyon Public Library is a public library in Kenyon, Minnesota, USA. It is a member of Southeastern Libraries Cooperating, the SE Minnesota library region.

== History ==
The Kenyon Public Library was established in 1901 by the Round Table Club of Kenyon. The starting treasury purchased 3 books totalling $5.33. Members also donated books and held fundraisers. The library received its first books on October 15, 1901. During its first year, there were 48 patrons and the circulation was 316. The library was then founded in 1907 and formally organized in 1908 as the Kenyon Library Association with a collection of 412 books.

Since its establishment, the library has moved 4 times to various locations throughout the city. It has been in its current location, housed with the City Hall, since 2000.
