= Faribault Viaduct =

- U.S. National Register of Historic Places
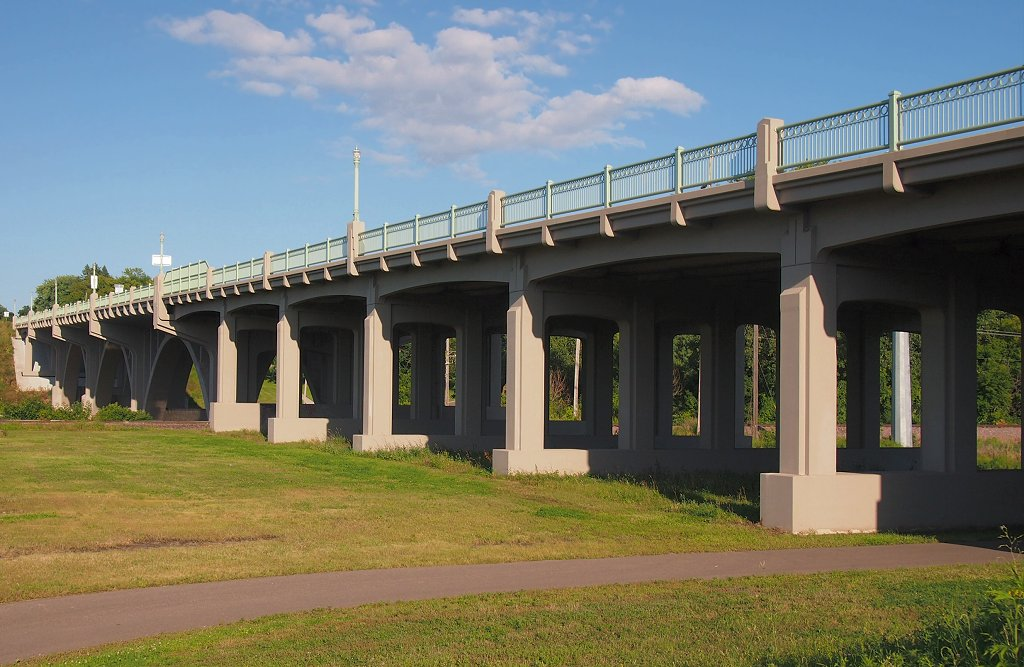
- The Faribault Viaduct

- Location within Minnesota Location within the United States
- Nearest city: Faribault, Minnesota
- Coordinates: 44°17′27″N 93°16′0″W
- Built: 1937
- NRHP reference No.: 89001848
- Designated: November 6, 1989

The Faribault Viaduct is a reinforced concrete highway bridge which carries Minnesota State Highway 60 over the Straight River in Faribault, Minnesota, United States.

It was constructed in 1937 by the Works Progress Administration with Art Deco/Classical Revival ornamentation, one of the last major examples in the state. The bridge has also been described as Moderne in style.

When listed on the National Register of Historic Places in 1989, it was noted as a civic project linking a city divided by a river and rail corridor. The bridge was rebuilt in 2008-09 and the decks widened, but the original piers and the three arches over the river remain.

== See also ==
- List of bridges on the National Register of Historic Places in Minnesota
- National Register of Historic Places listings in Rice County, Minnesota
