= Anders Andersen Bjelland =

Norwegian politician

- Born: 1790
- Died: June 28, 1850 (aged 59–60)
- Occupations: politician and farmer

Anders Andersen Bjelland (1790 in Nedstrand, Norway – June 28, 1850 in Nedstrand, Norway) was a Norwegian politician.

He was elected to the Norwegian Parliament in 1827, 1833 and 1842, representing the rural constituency of Stavanger Amt (today named Rogaland). He worked as a farmer.
