= Dennison, Minnesota =

City in Minnesota, United States

Dennison
- City
- Location of Dennison, Minnesota
- Coordinates: 44°24′32″N 93°01′49″W
- Country: United States
- State: Minnesota
- Counties: Goodhue, Rice

Area
  - Total: 1.26 sq mi (3.26 km^{2})
  - Land: 1.26 sq mi (3.26 km^{2})
  - Water: 0 sq mi (0.00 km^{2})
- Elevation: 1,034 ft (315 m)

Population (2020)
  - Total: 223
  - Density: 177.0/sq mi (68.35/km^{2})
- Time zone: UTC-6 (Central (CST))
  - Summer (DST): UTC-5 (CDT)
- ZIP code: 55018
- Area code: 507
- FIPS code: 27-15706
- GNIS feature ID: 2394516
- Website: https://www.cityofdennisonmn.com/

Dennison is a city in Goodhue and Rice counties in the U.S. state of Minnesota. As of the 2020 census, Dennison had a population of 223. Most of Dennison is in Goodhue County, with only a small part that extends into Rice County.

== History ==
A post office called Dennison has been in operation since 1885. The city was named for Morris P. Dennison, the original owner of the town site.

== Geography ==
According to the United States Census Bureau, the city has a total area of 1.26 square miles (3.26 km^{2}), all land.

Minnesota State Highways 56 and 246 are nearby, along with Goodhue County 9.

== Demographics ==
Historical population
Census	Pop.	Note	%±
1910	184		—
1920	218		18.5%
1930	262		20.2%
1940	216		−17.6%
1950	163		−24.5%
1960	179		9.8%
1970	203		13.4%
1980	176		−13.3%
1990	152		−13.6%
2000	168		10.5%
2010	212		26.2%
2020	223		5.2%
U.S. Decennial Census

=== 2010 census ===
As of the census of 2010, there were 212 people, 77 households, and 53 families living in the city. The population density was 168.3 inhabitants per square mile (65.0/km^{2}). There were 80 housing units at an average density of 63.5 per square mile (24.5/km^{2}). The racial makeup of the city was 92.5% White, 4.7% African American, and 2.8% from two or more races. Hispanic or Latino of any race were 1.4% of the population.

There were 77 households, of which 31.2% had children under the age of 18 living with them, 61.0% were married couples living together, 6.5% had a female householder with no husband present, 1.3% had a male householder with no wife present, and 31.2% were non-families. 26.0% of all households were made up of individuals, and 5.2% had someone living alone who was 65 years of age or older. The average household size was 2.75 and the average family size was 3.28.

The median age in the city was 39 years. 28.8% of residents were under the age of 18; 6% were between the ages of 18 and 24; 24% were from 25 to 44; 33.5% were from 45 to 64; and 7.5% were 65 years of age or older. The gender makeup of the city was 51.4% male and 48.6% female.

=== 2000 census ===
As of the census of 2000, there were 168 people, 60 households, and 49 families living in the city. The population density was 132.3 inhabitants per square mile (51.1/km^{2}). There were 64 housing units at an average density of 50.4 per square mile (19.5/km^{2}). The racial makeup of the city was 91.67% White, 0.60% Native American, 1.79% Asian, and 5.95% from two or more races.

There were 60 households, out of which 41.7% had children under the age of 18 living with them, 65.0% were married couples living together, 8.3% had a female householder with no husband present, and 18.3% were non-families. 16.7% of all households were made up of individuals, and 3.3% had someone living alone who was 65 years of age or older. The average household size was 2.80 and the average family size was 3.06.

In the city, the population was spread out, with 30.4% under the age of 18, 7.1% from 18 to 24, 33.3% from 25 to 44, 20.2% from 45 to 64, and 8.9% who were 65 years of age or older. The median age was 35 years. For every 100 females, there were 107.4 males. For every 100 females age 18 and over, there were 116.7 males.

The median income for a household in the city was $51,667, and the median income for a family was $53,750. Males had a median income of $30,417 versus $30,000 for females. The per capita income for the city was $19,038. None of the families and 1.3% of the population were living below the poverty line.
