= Minnesota State Highway 246 =

State highway in Minnesota, United States

Trunk Highway 246
- MN 246 highlighted in red

Route information
- Maintained by MnDOT
- Length: 18.221 mi (29.324 km)
- Existed: July 1, 1949–present

Major junctions
- West end: MN 3 in Northfield
- East end: MN 56 / CSAH 30 near Kenyon

Location
- Country: United States
- State: Minnesota
- Counties: Rice, Goodhue

Highway system
- Minnesota Trunk Highway System; Interstate; US; State; Legislative; Scenic
← MN 244	→ MN 247

Minnesota State Highway 246 (MN 246) is a 18.221-mile-long (29.324 km) highway in southeast Minnesota, which runs from its intersection with State Highway 3 in the city of Northfield and continues south and east to its eastern terminus at its intersection with State Highway 56 in Holden Township near Kenyon.

== Route description ==
Highway 246 serves as an east–west and a north–south route between the communities of Northfield, Dennison, Nerstrand, and Kenyon in southeast Minnesota. It follows a zigzag route running along section lines.

In the city of Northfield, Highway 246 follows Woodley Street W. and Division Street S.

Highway 246 passes near the town of Dennison at its junction with County Road 31.

The route is also known as Main Street in Nerstrand.

Nerstrand-Big Woods State Park is located near the junction of Highway 246 and Rice County Road 29 at Nerstrand. The park entrance is located on County Road 29.

The route is legally defined as Routes 246 and 320 in the Minnesota Statutes. It is not marked with the latter number.

== History ==
Highway 246 was authorized in 1949 between then-U.S. 65 at Northfield and Nerstrand. This original portion of the route was paved in 1956.

In 1959, the highway was extended east of Nerstrand to State Highway 56 in Holden Township near Kenyon. This segment was paved in the late 1970s.

== Major intersections ==
County	Location	mi	km	Destinations	Notes
Rice	Northfield	0.000	0.000	MN 3 – Faribault, Saint Paul	
Rice	Northfield	0.494	0.795	CSAH 28 (Woodley Street)	
Rice	Northfield	1.028– 1.034	1.654– 1.664	Jefferson Parkway	Four-way stop
Rice	Northfield Township	1.987	3.198	CSAH 1 / CR 81 (110th Street E)	
Rice	Northfield Township	2.122	3.415	CSAH 22 (Gates Avenue/Falk Trail)	
Rice	Northfield Township	3.492	5.620	CSAH 30 east (Valley Grove Road)	
Rice	Northfield Township	6.708	10.795	CSAH 31 (Dennison Boulevard) / CR 81 – Dennison	
Rice	Wheeling Township	10.231	16.465	CSAH 30 west (Valley Grove Road)	
Rice	Wheeling Township	11.310	18.202	CSAH 27 south (Kane Avenue) / CSAH 29 west (170th Street E)	
Rice	Nerstrand	12.307	19.806	CSAH 26 (Lamb Avenue)	
Goodhue	Holden Township	18.320	29.483	MN 56 / CSAH 30 – Kenyon	CSAH 30 continues to Wanamingo
1.000 mi = 1.609 km; 1.000 km = 0.621 mi
