= Mabel Johnson Leland =

American translator (1871–1947)

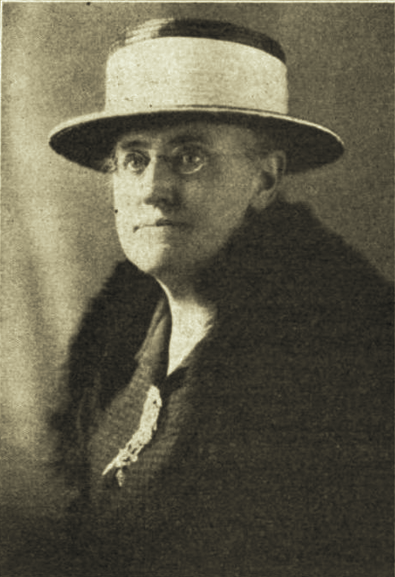
- Born: Mabel Johnson; September 7, 1871; West Salem, Wisconsin, U.S.
- Died: March 23, 1947 (aged 75)
- Resting place: Kenyon, Minnesota cemetery
- Education: Ripon College
- Occupations: lecturer; translator
- Spouse: Ragnvald Leland (m. 1897)
- Writing career
- Language: Nynorsk; English
- Notable work: translation of Arne Garborg's The Lost Father (1920)

Mabel Johnson Leland (September 7, 1871 – March 23, 1947) was an American lecturer on Scandinavian literature and translator from Norwegian to English. Her most notable work with the translation of Arne Garborg's The Lost Father from the New Norse (Boston, The Stratford Co., 1920).

== Early life and education ==
Mabel Johnson was born at West Salem, Wisconsin, September 7, 1871. Her parents emigrated from Ringsaker, Norway to the U.S. when each was young. Mabel's maternal grandparents were La Crosse County, Wisconsin pioneers.

She graduated from the local high school in 1888 and had a year's stay abroad. Further study was pursued at Ripon College in languages, literature and music. A course in piano and theory was completed under Rossetter Gleason Cole at the Ripon College School of Music in 1894. While at college, she identified with the YWCA, the Ecolian Literary society and the Inter-collegiate debating teams.

== Career ==
Leland studied Norwegian literature. Her particular contribution was to translate some of the new Norse writings into English. Aasmund Olavsson Vinje, Per Sivle, Anders Hovden, and Arne Garborg engaged her efforts. Garborg's Lost Father was her longest task, and placed her on the list of Minnesota writers. Lost Father is a prose poem in which the conflict of man with the spirit of Christ's teachings supplies the ground work for the story.

Leland was affiliated with the following organizations: The Round Table Club of Kenyon, of which she was a founder in 1898 and which was federated. She served as Secretary-Treasurer of Third District Minnesota Federated Women's Clubs; chair, in Kenyon League of Women Voters; Local Chair, Council of National Defense; member, Republican Woman's Club, of Woman's Auxiliary of American Legion. For 20 years, she was the secretary of the Kenyon Public Library Association. Leland also served as chair of a girls' Mission Band which united the efforts of young girls of all churches in a common work for children's relief.

Of her appointment as State Chair of the Woman's Auxiliary of the Norse-American Centennial (Minnesota State Fair, June 1925) she said:— "This experience has been one of the happiest of my life. To be able in some humble way to contribute to the celebration of this chapter in American History, commemorating the deeds of our intrepid ancestors,--to make the stimulating acquaintance of these splendid women who have put over the Art Exhibit and set going an educational program on the cultural contributions of this group of our country, to link these daughters of Vikings with the outstanding representatives sent from Norway's National Council of Women to the International meeting at Washington, D.C. who later came to Minnesota to share in our great celebration, will be an unforgettable period in my life."

== Personal life ==
In 1897, she married Dr. Ragnvald Leland, who after receiving examen artium from Aars' and Voss' Latin-school in Christiania in 1886, and examen philosophicum 1888, came to the U.S. and subsequently received a medical degree from the University of Minnesota, 1895, locating in Kenyon, Minnesota, where he practiced his profession thereafter.

They had five children: Harold, a graduate of the University of Minnesota Medical School; Valborg, head of the Violin Department of Stephens College, Columbia, Missouri; Hildur, a student at the Institute of Musical Art under Gaston Dethier; Maria and Margaret.

Mabel Johnson Leland died March 23, 1947. Interment was in the Kenyon, Minnesota cemetery.

== Selected works ==
- The Lost Father, Translated from the New Norse of Arne Garborg, By Mabel Johnson Leland (Boston, The Stratford Co., 1920) (Text)
