= Faribault Woolen Mill Company =

- Faribault Woolen Mill Company (now Faribault Mill)
- U.S. National Register of Historic Places
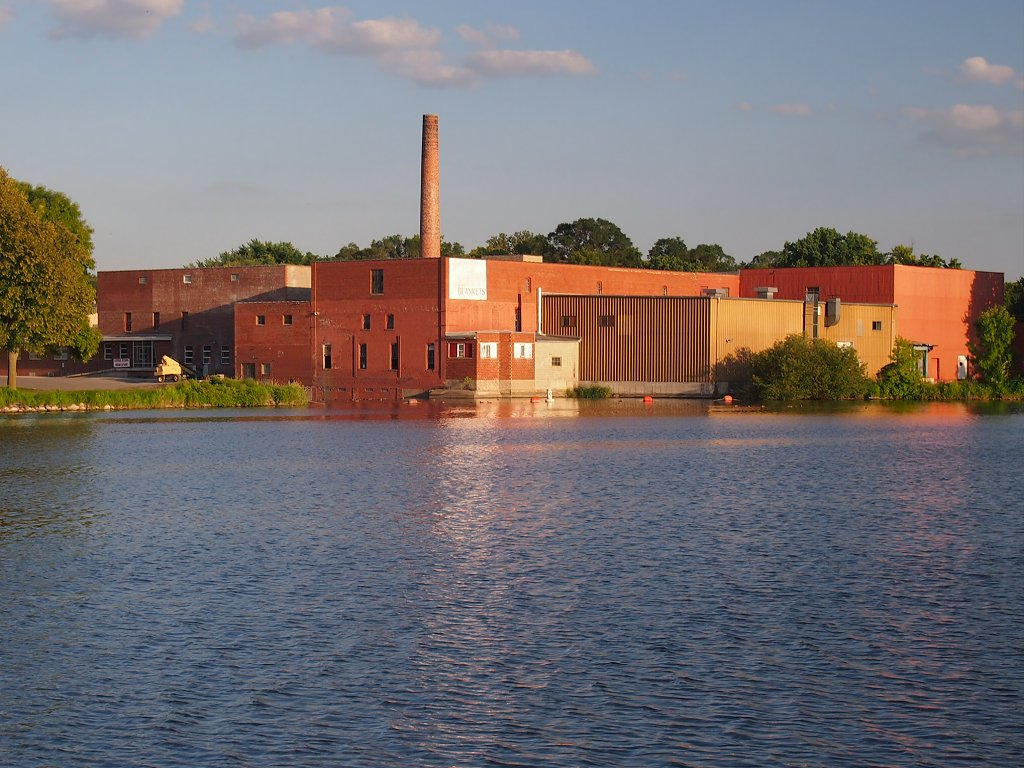
- Faribault Woolen Mills from the northwest

- Location within Minnesota Location within the United States
- Location: 1500 2nd Avenue NW, Faribault, Minnesota
- Coordinates: 44°18′25″N 93°16′21″W
- Area: 3 acres (1.2 ha)
- Built: 1892–1971
- NRHP reference No.: 12000283
- Designated: May 23, 2012

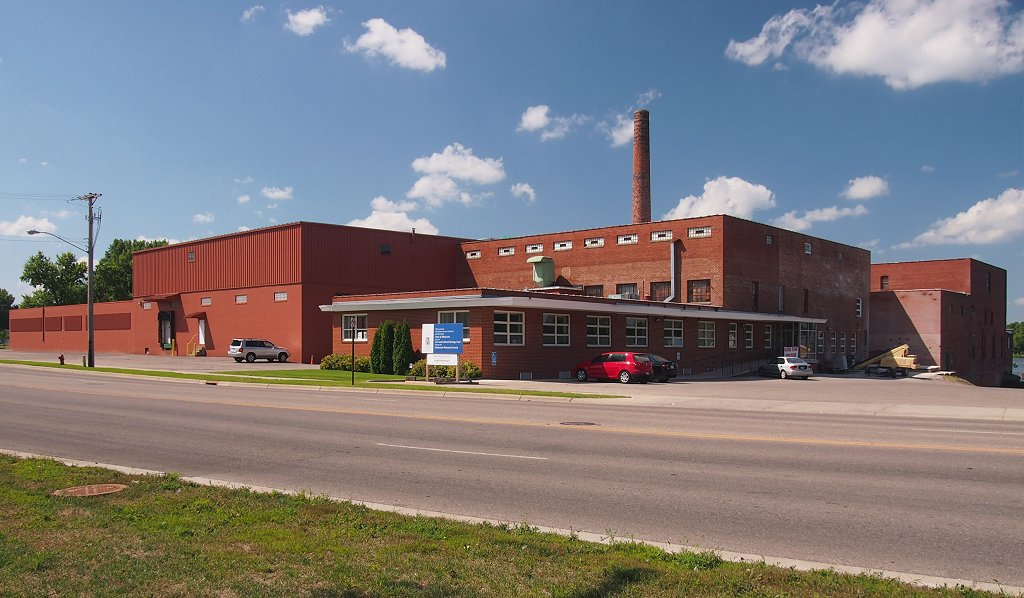
Faribault Woolen Mills from the northeast

Faribault Mill is a textile manufacturing company in Faribault, Minnesota, United States, that produces and sells wool and cotton blankets, throws, shawls, socks, sheets, and many other products. The company sells its products through its stores in Faribault and Edina, MN and nationwide through retailers.

Faribault Mill's building was listed on the National Register of Historic Places in 2012 for having state-level significance in the theme of industry. It was nominated for being one of the largest and oldest fully integrated woolen mills in Minnesota.

The plant closed in 2009, but reopened in September 2011 under new private ownership. At the time it closed in 2009, Faribault Woolen Mills produced more than half of the new wool blankets made in the United States and was one of the few remaining woolen mills in the country.

== Description ==
The Faribault Woolen Mills building is a product of over one hundred years of expansion. The building is utilitarian, with rectangular massing and sections ranging in height from one to three stories. Wall materials, including brick, concrete block, corrugated metal, and exposed timber and steel framing are in keeping with the property's industrial character. A large surface parking lot extends from the east side of the building around to the south and west sides of the building. The mill is part of an industrial area, which includes a cannery, on the edge of the city's residential core. The exterior of the building is simple and undecorated.

The company invested most of its profits in the interior to improve efficiency in the manufacturing process, with the last reorganization of the machinery occurring in 1971. The most recent major addition dates to that same time. The interior of the building reflects the mill's purpose as well. With the exception of the executive offices, it is industrial in character. Older sections of the building are timber-framed with exposed brick walls.

== History ==
Before the American Civil War, most woolen goods used in the United States were imported. After the war, domestic wool manufacturing increased as the country became more industrialized. The growth of wool production was aided by the Tariff Acts of 1867. The acts provided protection for domestic wool makers and made them more competitive. In Minnesota, the 1860s saw the beginning of many woolen manufacturing companies.

The Faribault Woolen Mill started as a small family-owned business in the 19th century and grew to become the largest and longest-surviving woolen mill in the state. Carl Henry Klemer entered the woolen mill business in 1865. From the beginning he chose a conservative approach to his business by keeping the financing and operations in the family. While larger mills were failing, the Klemers' continued to expand. In 1878 the company advertised as the "Faribault Woolen Mill" for the first time. Four years later Klemer moved the business to a stone building on the Straight River.

Over the next ten years, three fires devastated the mill. In 1892 the building was totally destroyed, and the Klemers purchased property on the Cannon River. They immediately built a fireproof brick building and in 1894 replaced the wooden dam that powered the facility with one made of stone. Throughout the 1890s the mill served local clients and continued to grow.

The company made a transition in leadership in 1904 when founder Carl Klemer died. His oldest grandson, Frank Klemer, joined the business along with other members of the Klemer family. In 1905 the company formally adopted the name it had been known by since the 1880s. It officially incorporated as the Faribault Woolen Mill Company.

Growth during the early 1900s was slow, but the change in leadership brought new products and small additions to the facility. In 1917 the company was awarded a contract with the United States Army for 100,000 blankets. This contract was a great success and led to growth in business during the 1920s. During the 1930s, the next generation of the Klemer family joined the company. Through the Great Depression years the company survived and even expanded. During World War II the mill manufactured army blankets. Afterward the younger generation of Klemers began managing the company. Marketing became a focus along with synthetic fiber experimentation and importing wool. Throughout the latter half of the twentieth century the facility grew gradually. Faribault Woolen Mills led the market with new products like washable wool and thermal weave blankets. In the early 1970s the company saw its greatest profit and made the largest addition to its facility.

In the 1990s, the Mill began to struggle. It was eventually purchased by North American Heritage Brands, but the Klemers still managed the company. North American Heritage Brands went bankrupt, and in 2009 the mill closed. In the autumn of 2011, cousins Chuck and Paul Mooty purchased the Faribault Woolen Mill and reopened the business. From 2011-2020, the Mootys operated the brand and marketing of Faribault Woolen Mill. In early 2020, Paul Mooty partnered with an investment group led by current Chairman, Paul Grangaard, to recapitalize. They have since organized the acquisition of Brahms Mount Cotton out of Maine, to expand Faribault Woolen Mill's product offering into cotton, forcing a brand name change to today's "Faribault Mill."

In addition to the brand name change, Faribault Mill has had several substantial achievements since the 2020 reorganization: they have introduced over 100 new products since 2020, realizing record revenue growth in four straight years, they have launched the Spread the Warmth campaign, donating thousands of blankets to homeless youth across the USA, they have spent millions updating their production facilities to drive efficiencies and job growth, and lastly, the Mill has been featured in television and news programs such as Yellowstone, 1923, The Marvelous Mrs. Maisel, The Today Show, ABC News, and many others.

== See also ==
- National Register of Historic Places listings in Rice County, Minnesota
