= Osmund Osmundson House =

Historic house in Minnesota, United States

- U.S. National Register of Historic Places
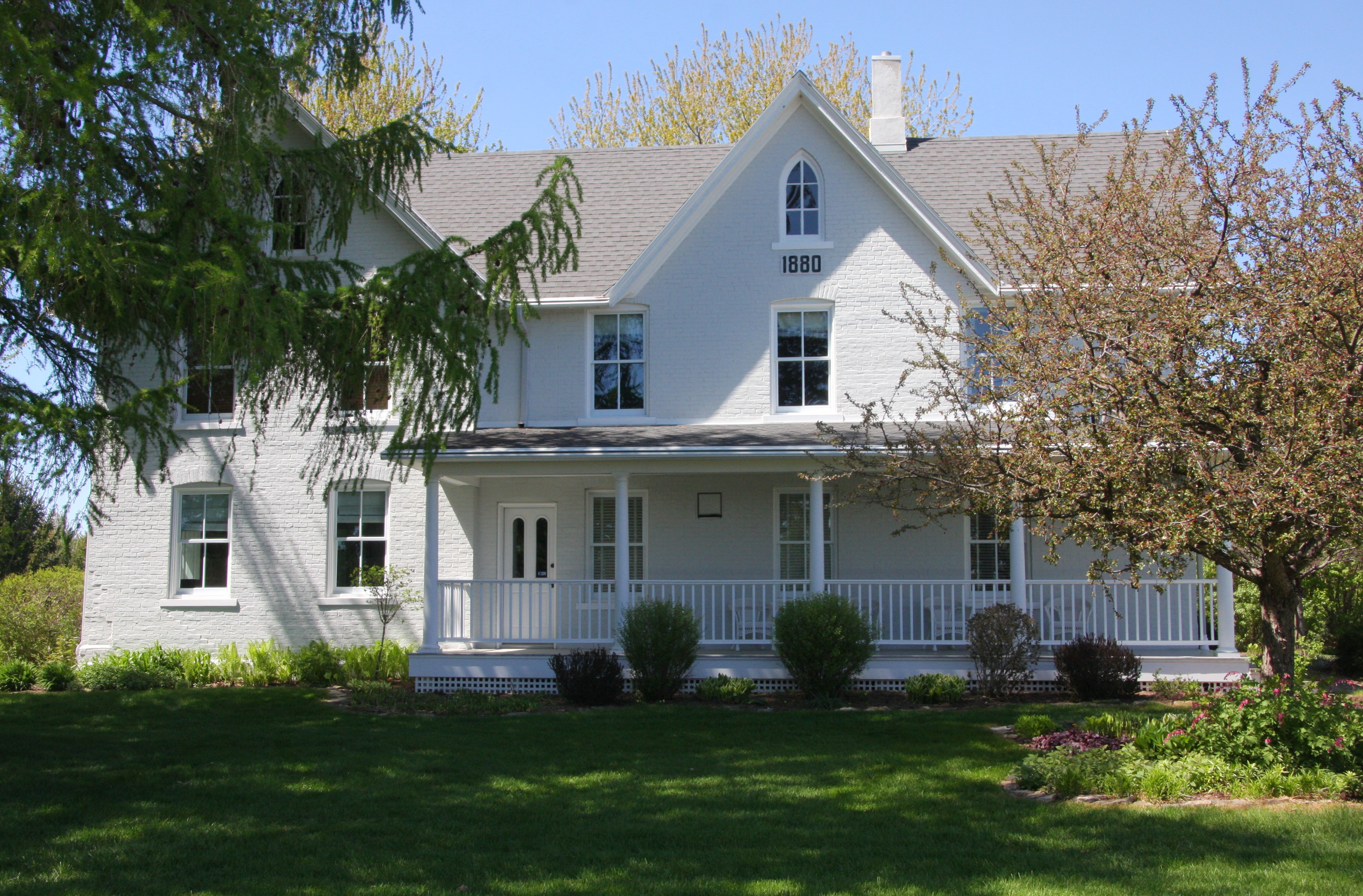

- Location within Minnesota Location within the United States
- Location: East Nerstrand and North Main Streets, Nerstrand, Minnesota
- Coordinates: 44°20′38″N 93°3′53″W
- Area: 1 acre (0.40 ha)
- Built: 1880
- MPS: Rice County MRA
- NRHP reference No.: 82003025
- Added to NRHP: April 06, 1982

The Osmund Osmundson House is a historic house in Nerstrand, Minnesota, United States. The private home was placed on the National Register of Historic Places (NRHP) on April 6, 1982. The house is significant for its association with a prominent Rice County pioneer and town founder.

== Structure ==
The Osmund Osmundson House is located in the northeast of the small town of Nerstrand, east of what were the rails for the Chicago Great Western Railway, since removed. The white, two-story gabled brick house was completed in 1880. The sprawling structure consists of two sections: each with an intersecting gable roof with wooden shingles. The south section, the left section of the front facade, is two bays by two bays and has portions that date to 1856. The north section measures three bays by two bays with a 1 1/2-story extension added to the rear (western) facade. Two over two windows are regularly spaced and slightly arched. The structure has two porches: an enclosed porch topped by a balcony on the rear (northwestern) corner as well as a modified front porch across the front section's three bays facade. The building originally had an elaborate balustraded full front porch and a red brick color.

== History and significance ==
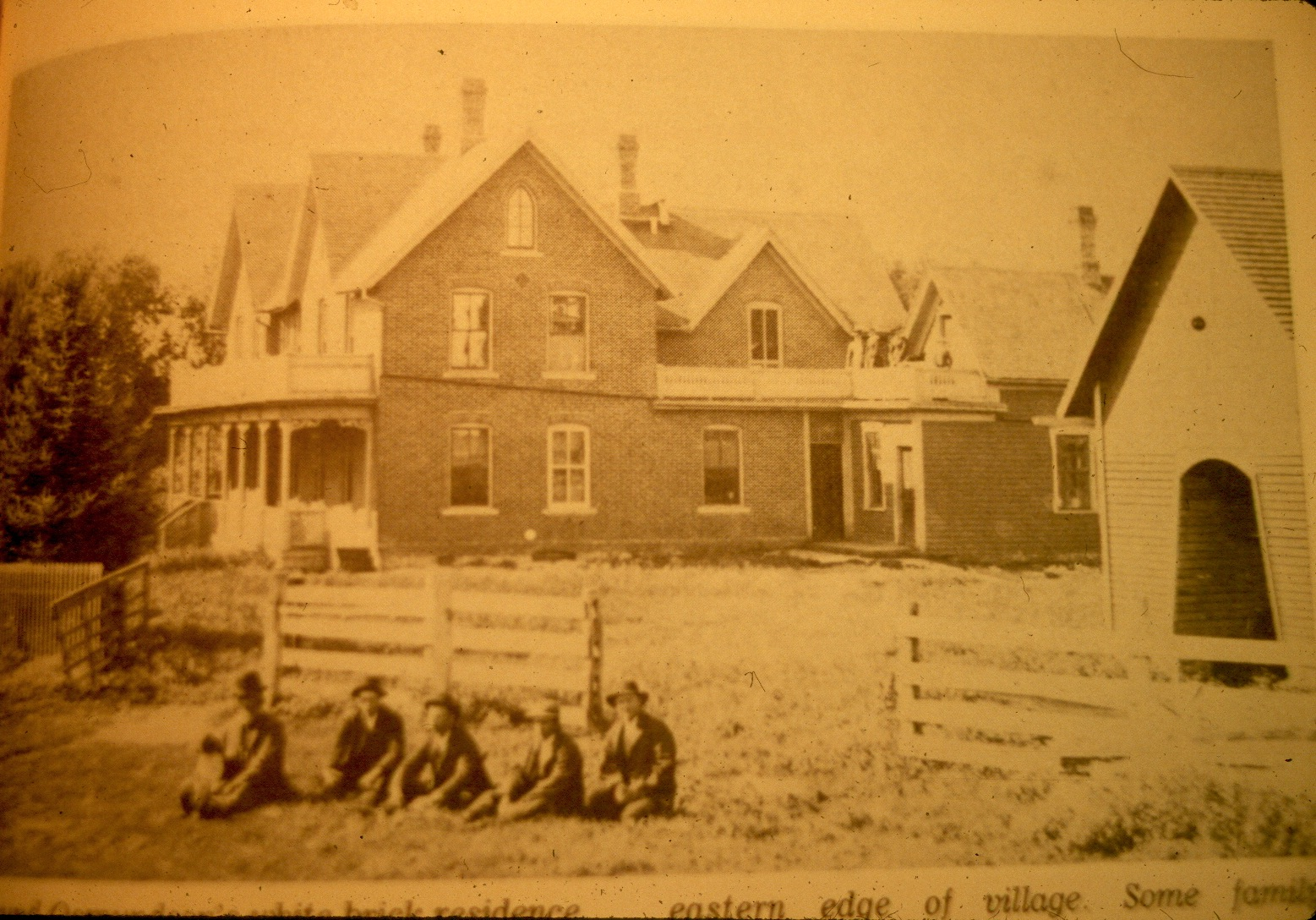
The Osmund Osmundson House around the turn of the twentieth century. Note the brick color and elaborate balustrade front porch.

Osmund Osmundson was born in Nedstrand in Tysvær, Norway in 1826 and immigrated to the United States in 1850. He settled in Milwaukee, Wisconsin before joining the California Gold Rush. In 1856 he moved to Wheeling Township in Rice County, Minnesota. He homesteaded the present site of Nerstrand, and began to envision a town on the site. In 1877, he built a store on what became the right-of-way for railroad tracks on what is now Main Street. In 1885, the Minnesota and North Western Railroad (later the Chicago Great Western Railway) was constructed and Osmundson platted the town on the line, naming it after his hometown. The area surrounding Nerstrand and Wheeling Township became a close-knit Norwegian American community. Osmundson went on to be active in county and state government, serving as Rice County commissioner for two terms and in the Minnesota State Legislature; he died in 1914.

The home was built to replace a log house built at the time he settled in the area, as well as a wood-frame house built in 1861. At the time the building was listed on the NRHP, it was owned and occupied by the third generation of Osmundsons.

== See also ==
- Thorstein Veblen Farmstead
- Bonde Farmhouse
