= Holden Township, Goodhue County, Minnesota =

Holden Township, Minnesota
- Township
- Location within the state of Minnesota Holden Township, Minnesota (the United States)
- Coordinates: 44°20′16″N 92°58′22″W
- Country: United States
- State: Minnesota
- County: Goodhue

Area
  - Total: 35.9 sq mi (93.0 km^{2})
  - Land: 35.9 sq mi (93.0 km^{2})
  - Water: 0 sq mi (0.0 km^{2})
- Elevation: 1,180 ft (360 m)

Population (2000)
  - Total: 457
  - Density: 13/sq mi (4.9/km^{2})
- Time zone: UTC-6 (Central (CST))
  - Summer (DST): UTC-5 (CDT)
- FIPS code: 27-29546
- GNIS feature ID: 0664494

Holden Township is a township in Goodhue County, Minnesota, United States. The population was 457 at the 2000 census.

Holden Township was organized in 1858.

== Geography ==
According to the United States Census Bureau, the township has a total area of 35.9 square miles (93 km^{2}), all land.

== Demographics ==
As of the census of 2000, there were 457 people, 146 households, and 120 families residing in the township. The population density was 12.7 inhabitants per square mile (4.9/km^{2}). There were 147 housing units at an average density of 4.1 per square mile (1.6/km^{2}). The racial makeup of the township was 98.25% White, 1.53% Asian and 0.22% Pacific Islander.

There were 146 households, out of which 45.9% had children under the age of 18 living with them, 71.9% were married couples living together, 4.1% had a female householder with no husband present, and 17.8% were non-families. 13.7% of all households were made up of individuals, and 4.8% had someone living alone who was 65 years of age or older. The average household size was 3.13 and the average family size was 3.37.

In the township the population was spread out, with 32.4% under the age of 18, 7.4% from 18 to 24, 28.0% from 25 to 44, 25.4% from 45 to 64, and 6.8% who were 65 years of age or older. The median age was 35 years. For every 100 females, there were 119.7 males. For every 100 females age 18 and over, there were 120.7 males.

The median income for a household in the township was $51,563, and the median income for a family was $52,500. Males had a median income of $31,750 versus $26,250 for females. The per capita income for the township was $17,806. About 11.3% of families and 12.7% of the population were below the poverty line, including 14.9% of those under age 18 and 31.6% of those age 65 or over.
