= Kenyon, Minnesota =

City in Minnesota, United States

Kenyon
- City
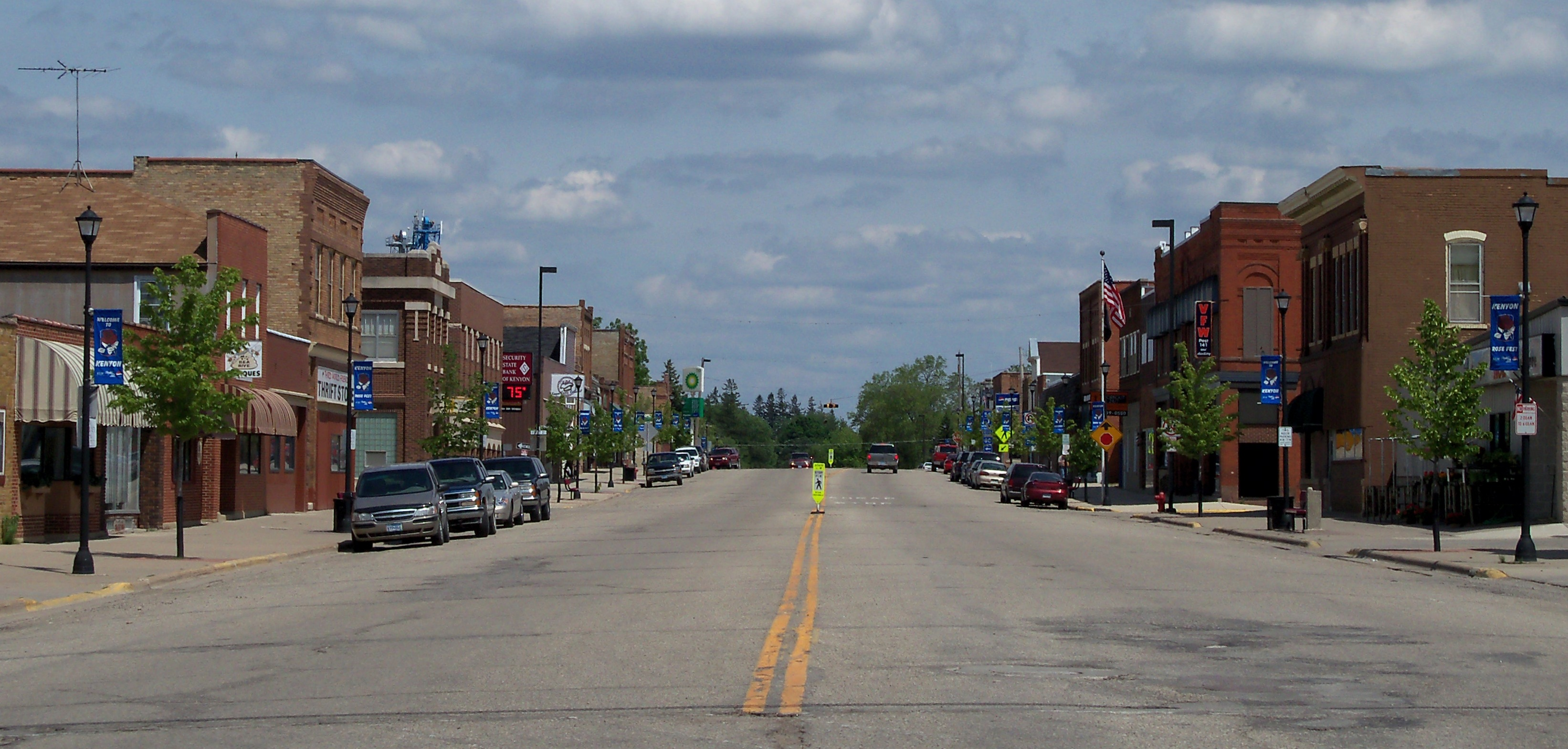
- Downtown Kenyon, June 2010
- Motto: "Boulevard Of Roses"
- Location of Kenyon, Minnesota
- Coordinates: 44°16′17″N 92°59′10″W
- Country: United States
- State: Minnesota
- County: Goodhue

Government
  - Mayor: Donald Kirchmann

Area
  - Total: 2.32 sq mi (6.01 km^{2})
  - Land: 2.31 sq mi (5.98 km^{2})
  - Water: 0.012 sq mi (0.03 km^{2})
- Elevation: 1,158 ft (353 m)

Population (2020)
  - Total: 1,894
  - Density: 820.1/sq mi (316.65/km^{2})
- Time zone: UTC-6 (Central (CST))
  - Summer (DST): UTC-5 (CDT)
- ZIP code: 55946
- Area code: 507
- FIPS code: 27-32840
- GNIS feature ID: 0646112
- Website: cityofkenyon.gov

Kenyon (/ˈkɛnjən/ KEN-yən) is a city in southwestern Goodhue County, Minnesota, United States, located along the North Fork of the Zumbro River. It was founded in 1856 and named in honor of Kenyon College. It is known for the Boulevard of roses on main street, which is the namesake of the town festival "Rosefest" held every August. The population was 1,894 at the 2020 census.

== Geography ==
According to the United States Census Bureau, the city has a total area of 2.35 square miles (6.09 km^{2}), of which 2.34 square miles (6.06 km^{2}) is land and 0.01 square miles (0.03 km^{2}) is water.

Minnesota State Highways 56 and 60 are two of the main routes in the city. Minnesota State Highway 246 is immediately north of Kenyon.

== Demographics ==
Historical population
| Census | Pop. | Note | %± |
|---|---|---|---|
| 1890 | 666 | | — |
| 1900 | 1,202 | | 80.5% |
| 1910 | 1,237 | | 2.9% |
| 1920 | 1,362 | | 10.1% |
| 1930 | 1,382 | | 1.5% |
| 1940 | 1,530 | | 10.7% |
| 1950 | 1,651 | | 7.9% |
| 1960 | 1,624 | | −1.6% |
| 1970 | 1,575 | | −3.0% |
| 1980 | 1,529 | | −2.9% |
| 1990 | 1,552 | | 1.5% |
| 2000 | 1,661 | | 7.0% |
| 2010 | 1,815 | | 9.3% |
| 2020 | 1,894 | | 4.4% |
U.S. Decennial Census

=== 2020 census ===
As of the 2020 census, Kenyon had a population of 1,894. The median age was 40.5 years. 23.0% of residents were under the age of 18 and 19.6% of residents were 65 years of age or older. For every 100 females there were 102.8 males, and for every 100 females age 18 and over there were 97.2 males age 18 and over.

0.0% of residents lived in urban areas, while 100.0% lived in rural areas.

There were 810 households in Kenyon, of which 29.3% had children under the age of 18 living in them. Of all households, 45.7% were married-couple households, 21.5% were households with a male householder and no spouse or partner present, and 25.2% were households with a female householder and no spouse or partner present. About 34.2% of all households were made up of individuals and 14.7% had someone living alone who was 65 years of age or older.

There were 852 housing units, of which 4.9% were vacant. The homeowner vacancy rate was 1.3% and the rental vacancy rate was 5.9%.

Racial composition as of the 2020 census
| Race | Number | Percent |
|---|---|---|
| White | 1,657 | 87.5% |
| Black or African American | 24 | 1.3% |
| American Indian and Alaska Native | 9 | 0.5% |
| Asian | 4 | 0.2% |
| Native Hawaiian and Other Pacific Islander | 0 | 0.0% |
| Some other race | 67 | 3.5% |
| Two or more races | 133 | 7.0% |
| Hispanic or Latino (of any race) | 159 | 8.4% |

=== 2010 census ===
As of the census of 2010, there were 1,815 people, 755 households, and 465 families living in the city. The population density was 775.6 inhabitants per square mile (299.5/km^{2}). There were 841 housing units at an average density of 359.4 per square mile (138.8/km^{2}). The racial makeup of the city was 94.9% White, 0.2% African American, 0.2% Native American, 0.2% Asian, 3.8% from other races, and 0.8% from two or more races. Hispanic or Latino of any race were 8.7% of the population.

There were 755 households, of which 29.7% had children under the age of 18 living with them, 49.4% were married couples living together, 8.1% had a female householder with no husband present, 4.1% had a male householder with no wife present, and 38.4% were non-families. 31.7% of all households were made up of individuals, and 15.1% had someone living alone who was 65 years of age or older. The average household size was 2.34 and the average family size was 2.92.

The median age in the city was 41.3 years. 23.7% of residents were under the age of 18; 7.6% were between the ages of 18 and 24; 24.4% were from 25 to 44; 23.7% were from 45 to 64; and 20.6% were 65 years of age or older. The gender makeup of the city was 49.4% male and 50.6% female.

=== 2000 census ===
As of the census of 2000, there were 1,661 people, 677 households, and 440 families living in the city. The population density was 736.6 inhabitants per square mile (284.4/km^{2}). There were 719 housing units at an average density of 318.9 per square mile (123.1/km^{2}). The racial makeup of the city was 96.21% White, 0.12% African American, 0.18% Native American, 1.02% Asian, 1.93% from other races, and 0.54% from two or more races. Hispanic or Latino of any race were 2.77% of the population.

There were 677 households, out of which 30.6% had children under the age of 18 living with them, 54.4% were married couples living together, 7.4% had a female householder with no husband present, and 34.9% were non-families. 29.8% of all households were made up of individuals, and 15.1% had someone living alone who was 65 years of age or older. The average household size was 2.37 and the average family size was 2.94.

In the city, the population was spread out, with 23.9% under the age of 18, 7.3% from 18 to 24, 27.5% from 25 to 44, 19.7% from 45 to 64, and 21.6% who were 65 years of age or older. The median age was 39 years. For every 100 females, there were 93.1 males. For every 100 females age 18 and over, there were 86.7 males.

The median income for a household in the city was $41,786, and the median income for a family was $50,000. Males had a median income of $34,000 versus $22,255 for females. The per capita income for the city was $19,569. About 2.3% of families and 5.2% of the population were below the poverty line, including 5.9% of those under age 18 and 7.0% of those age 65 or over.

== Notable people ==
- C. L. Brusletten, legislator and businessman
- Stephanie Edwards
- Mark Rein-Hagen - Game designer, Author
- Clifford L. Hilton - Minnesota Supreme Court justice
- Mabel Johnson Leland – lecturer, translator
- Luke Redfield - Singer/songwriter
- Steve Sviggum - 55th Speaker of the Minnesota House of Representatives
- Andrew Volstead - Politician known for the Volstead Act

== See also ==
- List of cities in Minnesota
- Kenyon Public Library
