= Nedstrand =

Village in Tysvær Municipality, Norway

- Village
- Interactive map of Nedstrand
- Coordinates: 59.34588°N 5.85551°E
- Country: Norway
- Region: Western Norway
- County: Rogaland
- District: Haugaland
- Municipality: Tysvær Municipality

Area
  - Total: 0.37 km^{2} (0.14 sq mi)
- Elevation: 13 m (43 ft)

Population (2025)
  - Total: 271
  - Density: 732/km^{2} (1,900/sq mi)
- Time zone: UTC+01:00 (CET)
  - Summer (DST): UTC+02:00 (CEST)
- Post Code: 5560 Nedstrand

Nedstrand (locally, Stranda) is a village in Tysvær Municipality in Rogaland county, Norway. The village is on the Nedstrand peninsula's southeast coast, at the confluence of the Nedstrandsfjorden and Vindafjorden. The village of Hindaråvåg and the Nedstrand Church both lie just west of Nedstrand.

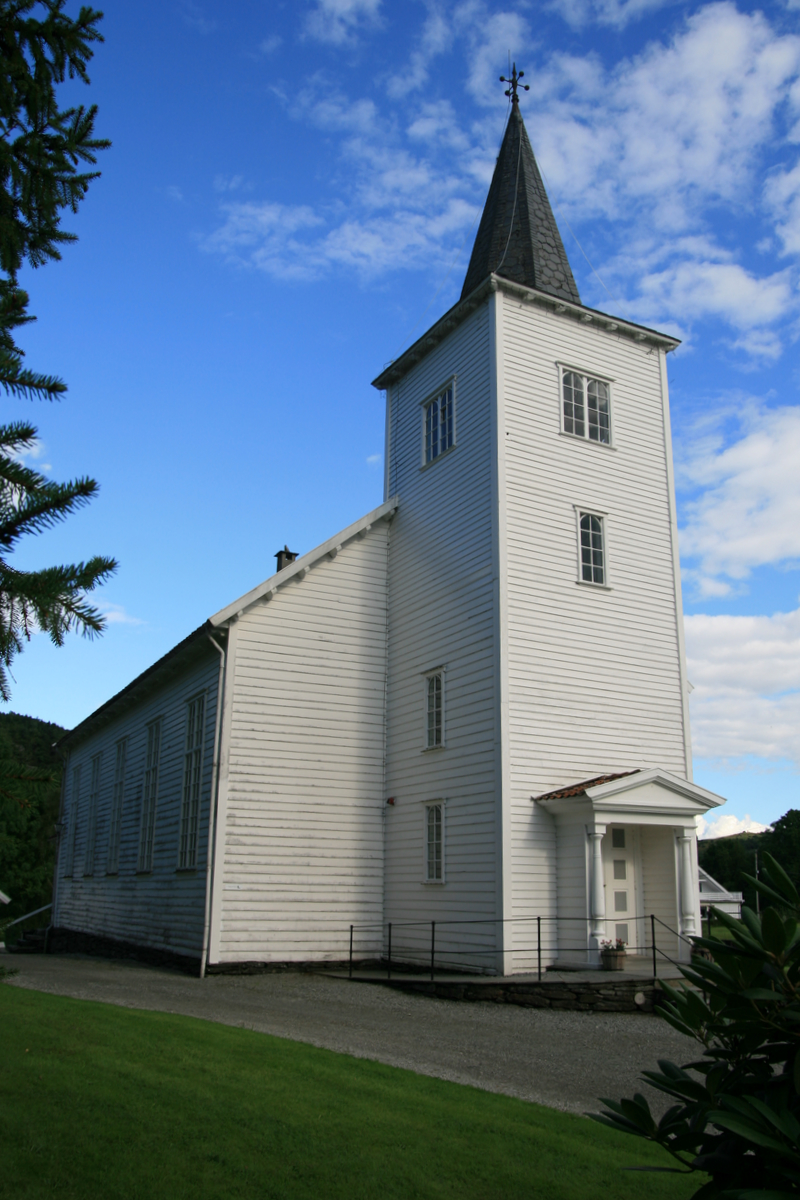
Nedstrand Church

The 0.37-square-kilometre (91-acre) village has a population (2025) of 271 and a population density of 732 inhabitants per square kilometre (1,900/sq mi).

The village is a regular ferry stop on routes to the Sjernarøyane islands (across the Nedstrandsfjorden) and to the village of Hebnes (across the Vindafjorden in Suldal Municipality). Both of those stops have other connections all over the region.

== History ==
The area was historically part of the old Nedstrand Municipality, and was a regional customs office for the huge timber industry in the Ryfylke district. Today, the area is home to agriculture, fish farming, fruit orchards, and stone quarries.

In 1983, the oil rig Alexander L. Kielland was scuttled in the Nedstrandsfjorden after it had capsized in the North Sea in 1980, killing 123 people.

== Notable people ==
- Anders Andersen Bjelland (1790–1850), a farmer & politician
- Niels Henrik Abel (1802–1829), a mathematician
- Osmund Osmundson (1826–1914), the founder of Nerstrand, Minnesota
- Rudi "Njål" London (born 1949), a recording artist, photo journalist, and author who was born at Nedre Helle in Nedstrand, later lived in Nashville, Tennessee, U.S.
