= C. L. Brusletten =

American politician

Christian L. Brusletten

Member of the Minnesota House of Representatives
- In office 1897–1901

Personal details
- Born: September 9, 1853 Nes, Buskerud, Norway
- Died: July 29, 1925 (aged 71) Kenyon, Minnesota, US
- Party: Republican
- Education: Northwestern Business College (1879)
- Occupation: Banker, Businessman, Politician

Christian L. Brusletten (September 9, 1853 – July 29, 1925) was an American banker, businessman, and elected official.

Christian Larson Brusletten was born at Nes in Buskerud, Norway. He was the son of Lars A. Brusletten (1823–1904) and Ingri (Dokken) Brusletten (1822–1900). He moved with his family to the United States in 1858. He graduated from the Northwestern Business College in Madison, Wisconsin in 1879. Brusletten in the banking and mercantile businesses. He served as President of the Citizens Bank of Kenyon.

Brusletten entered in local government in Kenyon, Minnesota and was the local postmaster. He served in the Minnesota House of Representatives as a Republican from 1897 to 1901. Brusletten died in Kenyon, Minnesota, and was buried at the Gol Lutheran Church Cemetery.
