= Faribault station (Rock Island Line) =

Historic railroad depot in Minnesota, U.S.

Faribault
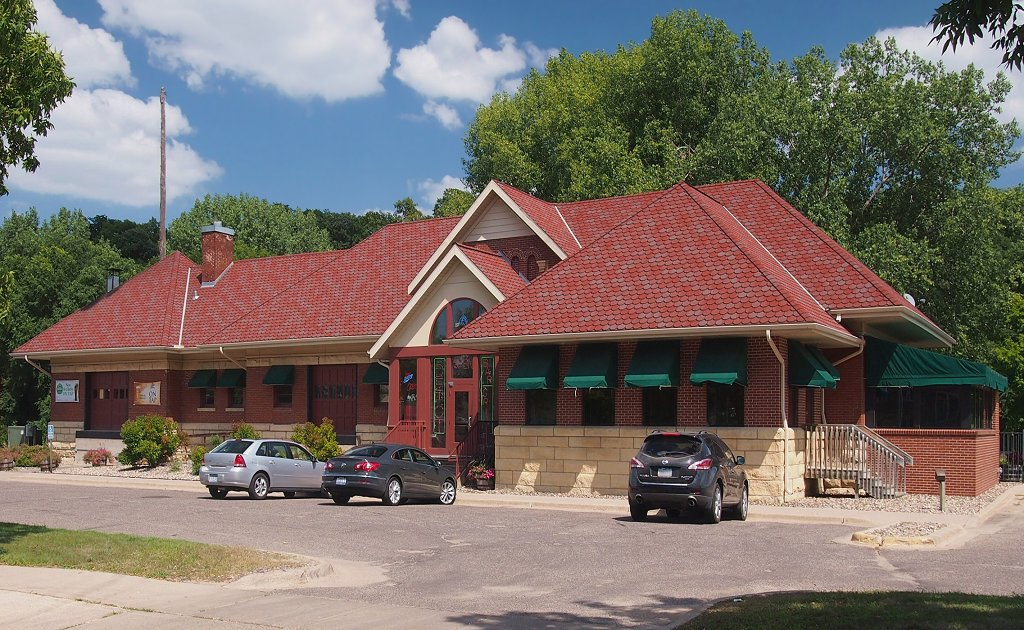
- Faribault Depot (2013)

General information
- Location: Third Street and First Avenue NE, Faribault, Minnesota
- System: Former intercity passenger rail station

History
- Opened: January 1902

Services
Preceding station	Chicago, Rock Island and Pacific Railroad	Following station
Medford toward Teague	Teague – Minneapolis	Dundas toward Minneapolis
Dundas toward Minneapolis	Burlington, Cedar Rapids and Northern Railway	Medford toward Burlington
- Rock Island Depot
- U.S. National Register of Historic Places
- Location within Minnesota
- Location: Third Street and First Avenue NE; Faribault, Minnesota, USA
- Coordinates: 44°17′39″N 93°15′56″W
- Built: January 1902
- NRHP reference No.: 82003017
- Added to NRHP: April 6, 1982
Location

The Rock Island Depot is a historic railroad depot in downtown Faribault, Minnesota, United States, constructed by the Burlington, Cedar Rapids and Northern Railway in January 1902. The line was turned over to the Chicago, Rock Island, and Pacific Railroad in June of the same year.

The depot was constructed for use as a passenger depot and originally contained four rooms. The central pavilion area, housing office and entry, was flanked by men and women's waiting rooms to the south and north; a baggage room occupied the room to the north of the ladies waiting room. After the 1930s, the building was converted to use as a combination passenger/freight depot.

For a time, the depot was served by the famous Twin Star Rocket.
