= Thorstein Veblen Farmstead =

- U.S. National Register of Historic Places
- U.S. National Historic Landmark
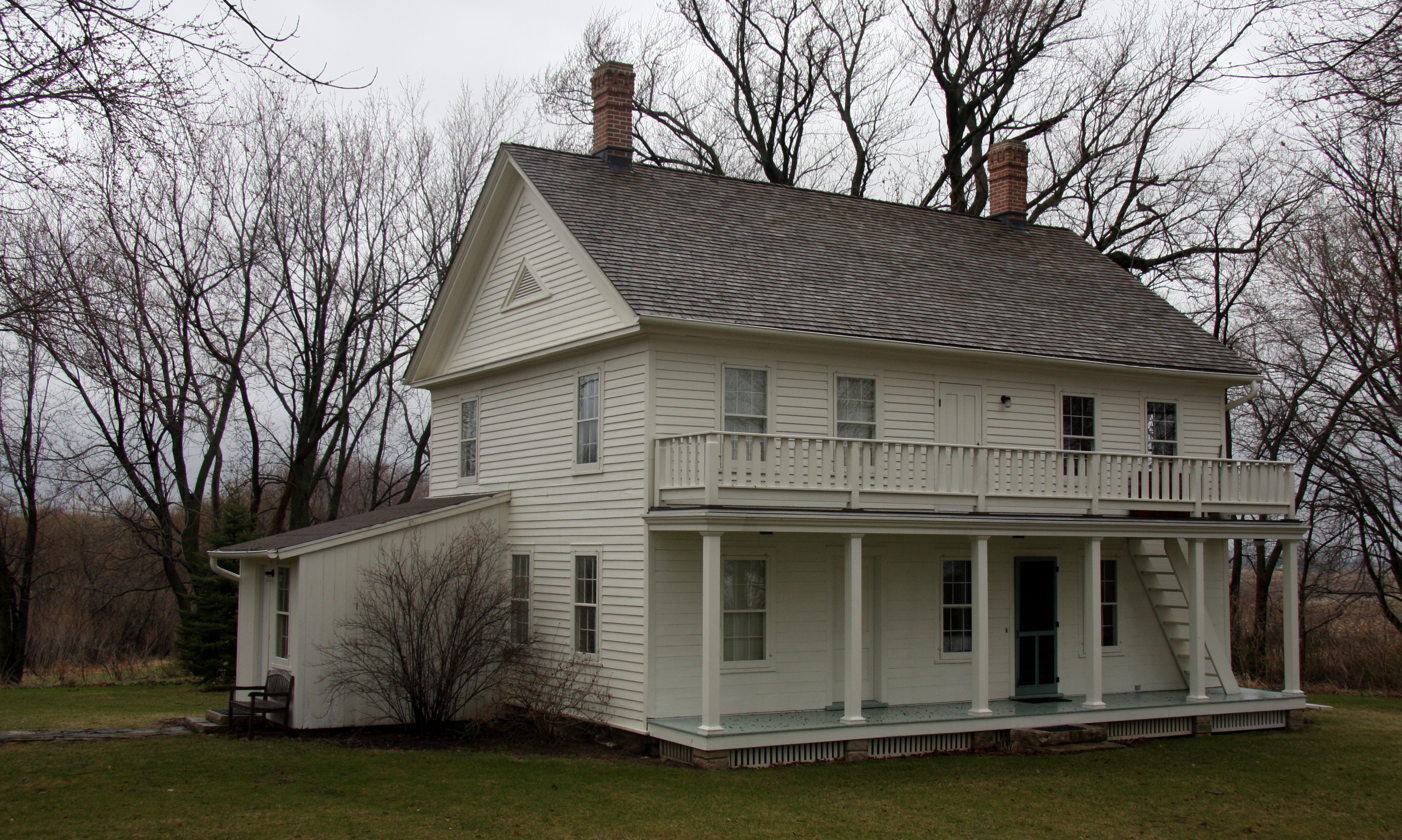
- The farmhouse in 2014

- Location within Minnesota Location within the United States
- Location: 16538 Goodhue Avenue; Nerstrand, Minnesota
- Coordinates: 44°20′52″N 93°02′49″W
- Area: 10 acres (4.0 ha)
- Built: 1867-1870
- Architectural style: Greek Revival
- NRHP reference No.: 75001024

Significant dates
- Added to NRHP: June 30, 1975
- Designated NHL: December 21, 1981

The Thorstein Veblen Farmstead is a National Historic Landmark near Nerstrand in rural Rice County, Minnesota. The property preserves the childhood home of Norwegian-American economist and sociologist Thorstein Veblen (1857–1929), best known for his 1899 treatise The Theory of the Leisure Class.

== Description and history ==
The Veblen farmstead stands east of Nerstrand in eastern Rice County, north of Minnesota State Highway 246. The ten-acre property includes a house, chicken coop, granary, and barn with attached milking shed. The house, granary, and barn were all built by Thomas Veblen, Thorstein's father, in the 1870s and 1880s. The house is a two-story frame structure, with a side gable roof, two chimneys, and clapboard siding. A single-story porch extends across the front, supported by square posts, with a balcony above. The granary is a small two-story clapboarded frame building, measuring about 25 by 30 feet (7.6 m × 9.1 m). The barn is two stories, and has a gabled roof.

Thorstein Veblen, born in Cato, Wisconsin, in 1857, lived on this farm in his youth and returned often as an adult, due in part to his inability to find steady employment. The product of an austere agrarian upbringing, Veblen, who has often been called one of America's most creative and original thinkers, coined the term "conspicuous consumption" in the widely influential The Theory of the Leisure Class (1899). The property's simple vernacular styling illustrates early influences on Veblen's life as the son of immigrants, growing up in a tightly knit Norwegian-American community.

The Veblens sold the property in 1893 and it continued to be an active farm until 1970, when the buildings fell into disrepair. The house has now been restored, and the Preservation Alliance of Minnesota holds a preservation easement on the property.

== See also ==
- List of National Historic Landmarks in Minnesota
- National Register of Historic Places listings in Rice County, Minnesota
- Washington Island (Wisconsin) § Culture
