= Nerstrand-Big Woods State Park =

State park in Minnesota, United States

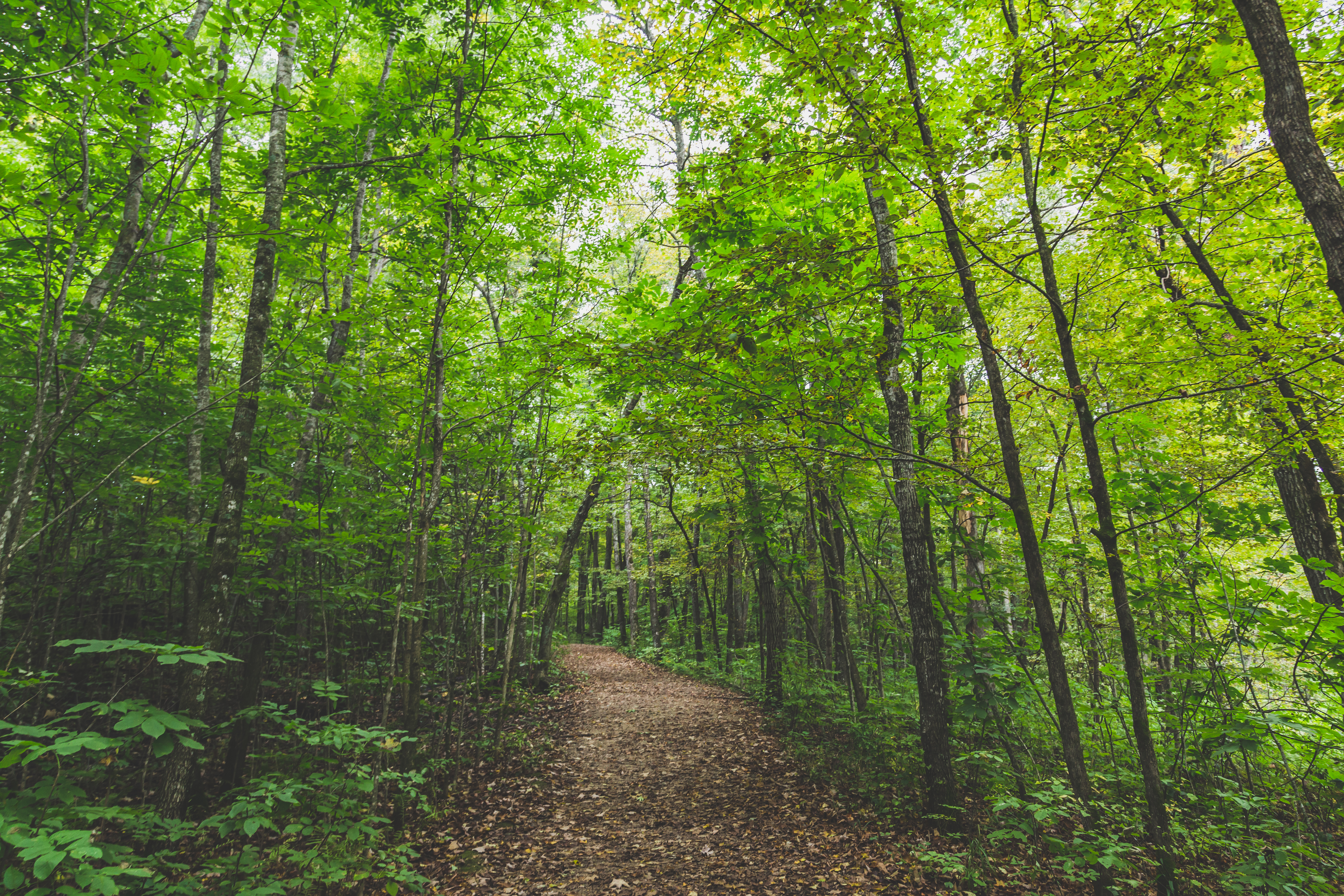
- Nerstrand-Big Woods State Park is a botanical reserve for the temperate hardwood forest that once covered much of central Minnesota

- Location within Minnesota Location within the United States
- Location: Rice County, Minnesota, United States
- Coordinates: 44°20′42″N 93°6′26″W
- Area: 2,882 acres (11.66 km^{2})
- Elevation: 1,086 ft (331 m)
- Established: 1945
- Governing body: Minnesota Department of Natural Resources

Nerstrand-Big Woods State Park is a state park of Minnesota, US, northeast of Faribault just outside the small town of Nerstrand. The park derives its name from the Big Woods, a large, contiguous forested area covering much of southeast Minnesota prior to the 1840s, when European settlers began to establish farms in the territory, and from Nedstrand in Tysvær Municipality, Norway, of which Nerstrand is a namesake. The park and its forest were an outlying 'woods' typical of and similar to the Big Woods proper, which were historically found on the more recent glacier deposits located west of the Cannon River 10 miles (16 km) to the west. Aside from a small waterfall, the outstanding natural feature of the park is the forest itself.

== Natural history ==
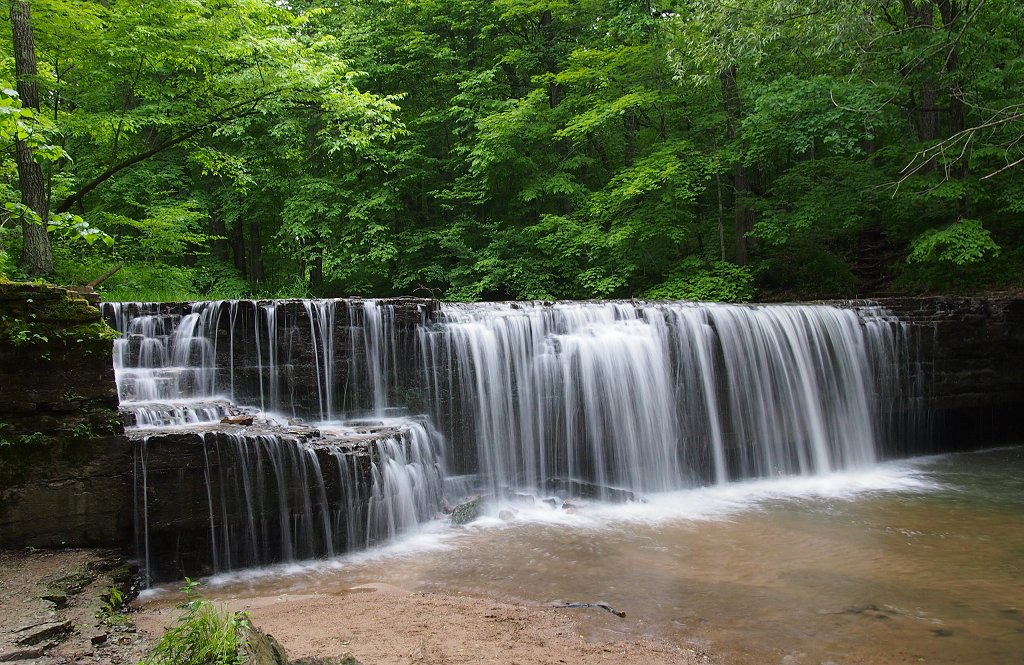
Hidden Falls, a small waterfall on Prairie Creek

The Platteville Limestone formation, deposited almost 500 million years ago during the Ordovician Period, forms the bedrock of the park. The limestone is exposed only in a few places along Prairie Creek, most notably at Hidden Falls. The rest of the park is covered in glacial drift up to 150 feet (46 m) deep. A later glaciation passed 10 miles (16 km) to the west, from which meltwater flowed and enlarged the valley of Prairie Creek.

This area was once covered in spruce forest, but as the climate warmed after the end of the last ice age, oak stands and prairie became dominant. 400 to 500 years ago, the climate cooled slightly, promoting the growth of the Big Woods.

In the spring, native wildflowers bloom in abundance. A remnant population of the dwarf trout lily, an endangered plant endemic to this area, is present in the park.

== Cultural history ==
The town of Nerstrand was settled in the 1850s, though unlike most prairie farming communities, they were fortunate to have a stand of trees nearby. Following a pattern of their European homeland, the adjacent forest was divided into woodlots, typically of 10 or 20 acres (4 or 8 ha) each, which the individual owners managed according to their own needs. The timbers and planks for most of the area's barns, and some of its houses, were cut from old-growth oak present in the area that is now the park. Some lots were cleared for farming or grazing, but many were left as sustainable sources of firewood. This mosaic of uses created patches where native animals and plants could survive and then recolonize other lots as usage changed over the years, resulting in the high quality of the habitat today. In the 1930s, large lumber companies attempted to acquire the land for logging. However, the lots were divided among 169 owners, not all of whom even lived in Minnesota anymore, and buying enough land to log commercially proved to be so complicated that each company gave up.

Local requests to evaluate Nerstrand Woods as a state park site were received favorably by Minnesota officials in 1934. However, the diverse ownership situation which preserved the woods in the first place also stalled the acquisition of parkland. Legislative bills failed, and local interest waned, but in 1938 a new federal law allowed the United States Forest Service (USFS) to purchase land here and swap it for state-owned land within Superior National Forest. By 1944 the USFS had title to 460 acres (190 ha) and a bill officially authorizing Nerstrand Woods State Park passed the next year. A unique clause was inserted in the legislation giving the University of Minnesota the option to conduct forestry experiments in suitable park areas. The Minnesota Department of Natural Resources purchased more of the woodlots during a series of offers starting in the 1950s, expanding the park to cover approximately two square miles, though some private inholdings remained. Trails and a picnic area were developed, followed by a campground in the 1960s. In 1992 the park's name was modified to Nerstrand Big Woods State Park to emphasize the habitat it preserved. Acquisition of inholdings and surrounding land continues, with recent acquisitions including the former Nerstrand Town Dump to the northwest of the park, and a dairy farm to the east.

== Recreation ==
Park facilities include individual and group campsites, picnic areas, a playground, and an extensive network of hiking trails. The park is unique among Minnesota state parks in that it has neither access to a body of water suitable for recreation nor a major historical site. The park is lightly utilized, with vacant campsites on every night except major summer holidays such as Memorial Day and Labor Day, according to DNR statistics.

The southern half of the park is open to snowmobiles during the winter months, while the northern half is reserved for cross-country skiing.
