= Nerstrand, Minnesota =

City in Minnesota, United States

Nerstrand
- City
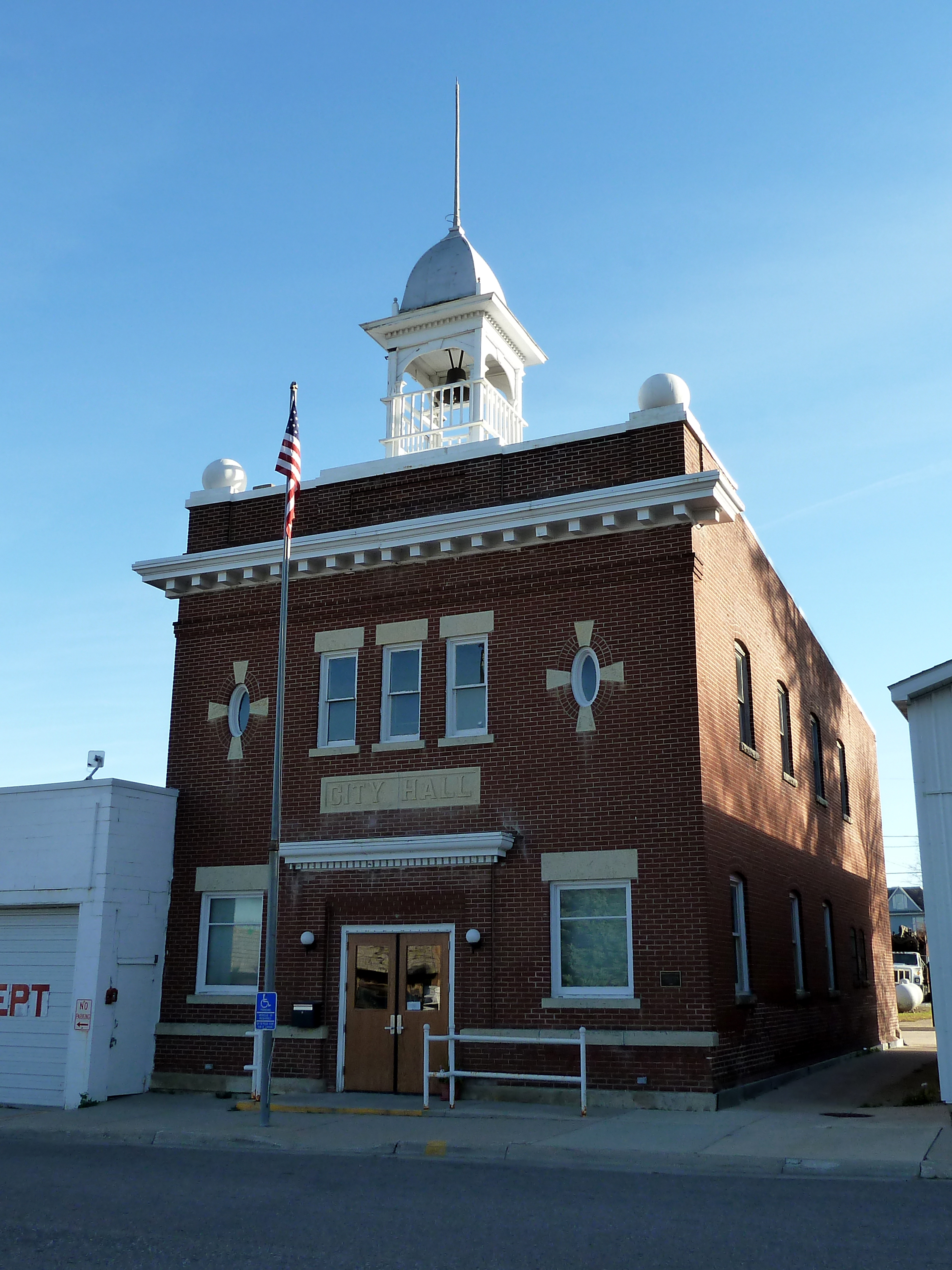
- Nerstrand's historic City Hall building, listed on the National Register of Historic Places

- Location of Nerstrand, Minnesota
- Coordinates: 44°20′35″N 93°03′50″W
- Country: United States
- State: Minnesota
- County: Rice

Area
  - Total: 1.42 sq mi (3.67 km^{2})
  - Land: 1.42 sq mi (3.67 km^{2})
  - Water: 0 sq mi (0.00 km^{2})
- Elevation: 1,188 ft (362 m)

Population (2020)
  - Total: 273
  - Density: 192.9/sq mi (74.47/km^{2})
- Time zone: UTC-6 (Central (CST))
  - Summer (DST): UTC-5 (CDT)
- ZIP code: 55053
- Area code: 507
- FIPS code: 27-45196
- GNIS feature ID: 2395175
- Website: https://nerstrandmn.org/

Nerstrand (/ˈnɪərstʃrænd/ NEER-schrand) is a city in Rice County, Minnesota, United States. As of the 2020 census, Nerstrand had a population of 273.

Minnesota State Highway 246 serves as a main route in the community. Minnesota State Highways 56 and 60 are nearby.

== History ==
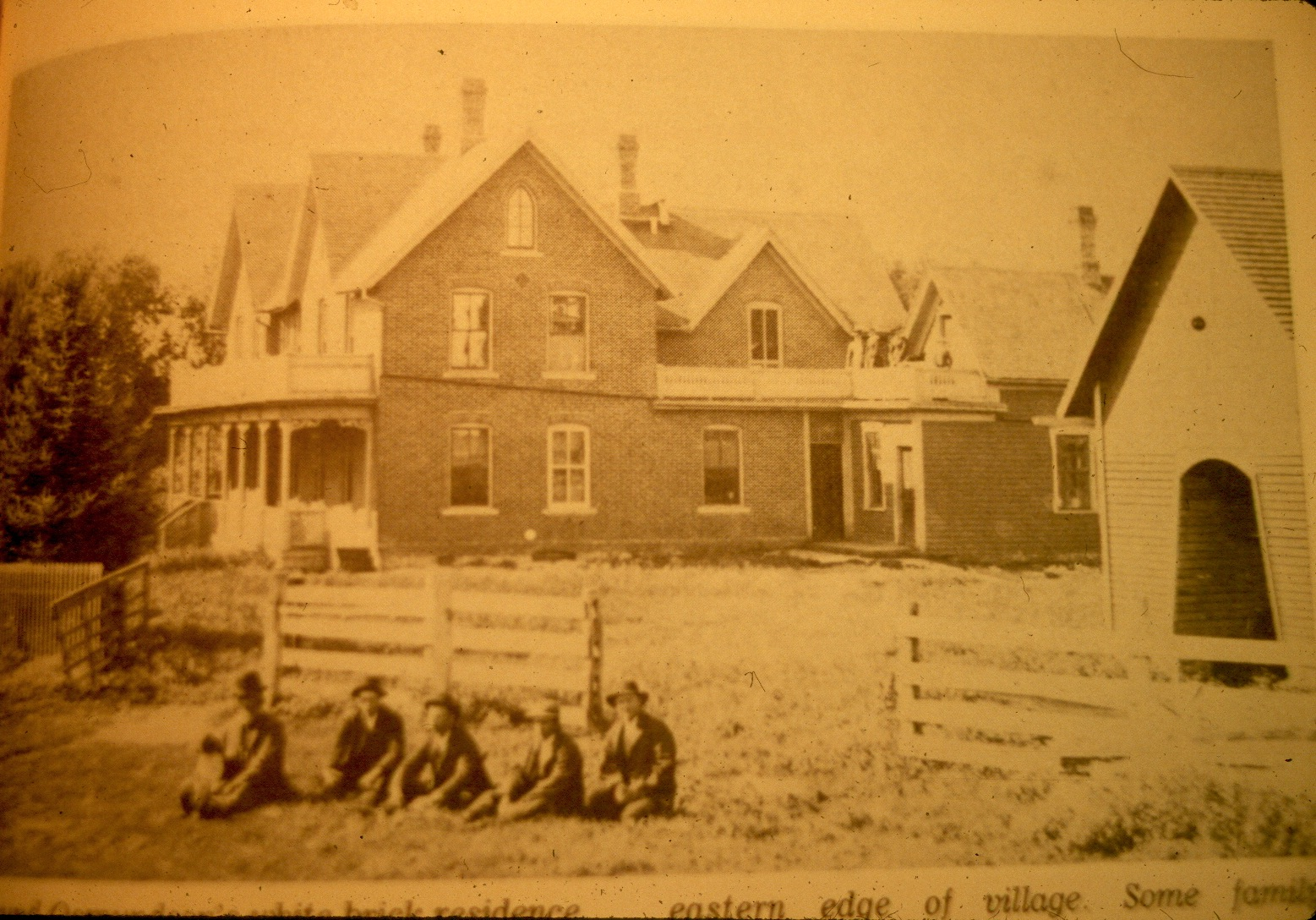
The Osmund Osmundson House, c. 1890s.

In 1856, Norwegian immigrant Osmund Osmundson moved to Wheeling Township in Rice County. He homesteaded the present site of Nerstrand, building a house and farm, and began to envision a town on the site. In 1877 he built a store on what became the right-of-way for railroad tracks on what is now Main Street. In 1885 the Minnesota and North Western Railroad (later the Chicago Great Western Railway) was constructed, extending from Lyle, Minnesota to St. Paul, and Osmundson platted the town on the line, naming it after the hometown of Nedstrand (now part of Tysvær Municipality in Rogaland county), Norway.

The town was the center of a significant Norwegian immigrant community, which included people in the surrounding township and county. Some, like Osmundson and Tosten Bonde (who lived just outside the city limits), became state legislators. Thorstein Veblen, who grew up just outside the town, became a noted sociologist and economist.

The town incorporated in 1897 and its first city hall was built that year. It proved too small within a few years, and a new city hall was built in 1907. Nerstrand City Hall was placed on the National Register of Historic Places on April 6, 1982, alongside the Osmund Osmundson House and the Bonde Farmhouse. The Thorstein Veblen Farmstead became a National Historic Landmark. The railroad tracks have been removed.

== Law/government ==
Nerstrand has four city council members and a mayor.

== Geography ==
According to the United States Census Bureau, the city has a total area of 1.417 square miles (3.67 km^{2}), all land.

The town was notorious for the nearby Nerstrand Hill, bane of the locomotive engineer, with the steepest grade on the line from St. Paul to Manly Junction, Iowa.

== School ==
The town has an elementary school for grades K-5, Nerstrand Elementary School, operated by Faribault Public School ISD#656 as a charter school under state law. The school has 155 students as of the 2019–20 school year.

== Attractions ==
Nerstrand-Big Woods State Park is nearby.

The nearby Valley Grove Church Building is considered an important historical site, though several active churches around the area are better preserved:

- St. John's United Church of Christ (3 mi southwest)
- Grace Lutheran Church (ELCA) (in town)
- Nerstrand United Methodist Church (in town)
- Gol Lutheran Church (ELCA) (4 mi southeast)

== Economy ==
Throughout its history, Nerstrand has been a source of services to area farmers. A full-service grain elevator still operates today and provides over half the employment in Nerstrand.

The business district declined with the advent of the automobile, with most area residents choosing to shop in Northfield, which has always been more prominent because of its two colleges, or Faribault, the county seat.

As businesses left, Nerstrand became more of a bedroom community for people working in Northfield, Faribault, or Kenyon. A few nonretail businesses, including a cabinet shop and two specialty construction firms, have come to the community, occupying what would otherwise be vacant storefronts.

== Demographics ==
Historical population
Census	Pop.	Note	%±
1900	256		—
1910	292		14.1%
1920	245		−16.1%
1930	283		15.5%
1940	251		−11.3%
1950	228		−9.2%
1960	584		156.1%
1970	231		−60.4%
1980	255		10.4%
1990	210		−17.6%
2000	233		11.0%
2010	295		26.6%
2020	273		−7.5%
U.S. Decennial Census

=== 2010 census ===
As of the census of 2010, there were 295 people, 108 households, and 91 families residing in the city. The population density was 207.7 inhabitants per square mile (80.2/km^{2}). There were 120 housing units at an average density of 84.5 per square mile (32.6/km^{2}). The racial makeup of the city was 96.9% White, 0.3% Native American, 0.7% Asian, 1.7% from other races, and 0.3% from two or more races. Hispanic or Latino of any race were 3.1% of the population.

There were 108 households, of which 40.7% had children under the age of 18 living with them, 73.1% were married couples living together, 6.5% had a female householder with no husband present, 4.6% had a male householder with no wife present, and 15.7% were non-families. 12.0% of all households were made up of individuals, and 3.7% had someone living alone who was 65 years of age or older. The average household size was 2.73 and the average family size was 2.96.

The median age in the city was 37.1 years. 28.1% of residents were under the age of 18; 4.5% were between the ages of 18 and 24; 29.5% were from 25 to 44; 22.8% were from 45 to 64; and 15.3% were 65 years of age or older. The gender makeup of the city was 47.8% male and 52.2% female.

=== 2000 census ===
As of the census of 2000, there were 233 people, 80 households, and 65 families residing in the city. The population density was 164.3 inhabitants per square mile (63.4/km^{2}). There were 82 housing units at an average density of 57.8 per square mile (22.3/km^{2}).

There were 80 households, out of which 45.0% had children under the age of 18 living with them, 72.5% were married couples living together, 7.5% had a female householder with no husband present, and 18.8% were non-families. 16.3% of all households were made up of individuals, and 10.0% had someone living alone who was 65 years of age or older. The average household size was 2.91 and the average family size was 3.26.

In the city, the population was spread out, with 33.9% under the age of 18, 4.3% from 18 to 24, 33.9% from 25 to 44, 15.0% from 45 to 64, and 12.9% who were 65 years of age or older. The median age was 33 years. For every 100 females, there were 91.0 males. For every 100 females age 18 and over, there were 90.1 males.

The median income for a household in the city was $41,500, and the median income for a family was $50,156. Males had a median income of $32,500 versus $23,333 for females. The per capita income for the city was $15,362. None of the families and 0.4% of the population were living below the poverty line.

== Notable person ==
Thorstein Veblen (1857–1929), usually characterized as an economist or sociologist, and best known for his book The Theory of the Leisure Class (ISBN 0-14-018795-2), lived about a mile northeast of town. His house and farm, the Thorstein Veblen Farmstead, contained several innovations, including what is believed to be the first bucket elevator installed on a farm in Rice County. The Thorstein Veblen Farmstead was renovated in 1994 as a historic site and is occasionally open to the public. As of September 2016 it is a flower farm.

== Bibliography ==
- Nerstrand Bicentennial Committee, The. 1976. Nerstrand: a history. Nerstrand, Minnesota: The committee.
- Nerstrand Women's Club. 1949. History of the Nerstrand Community. [Nerstrand, Minnesota].
