= Wheeling Township, Rice County, Minnesota =

Wheeling Township, Minnesota
- Township
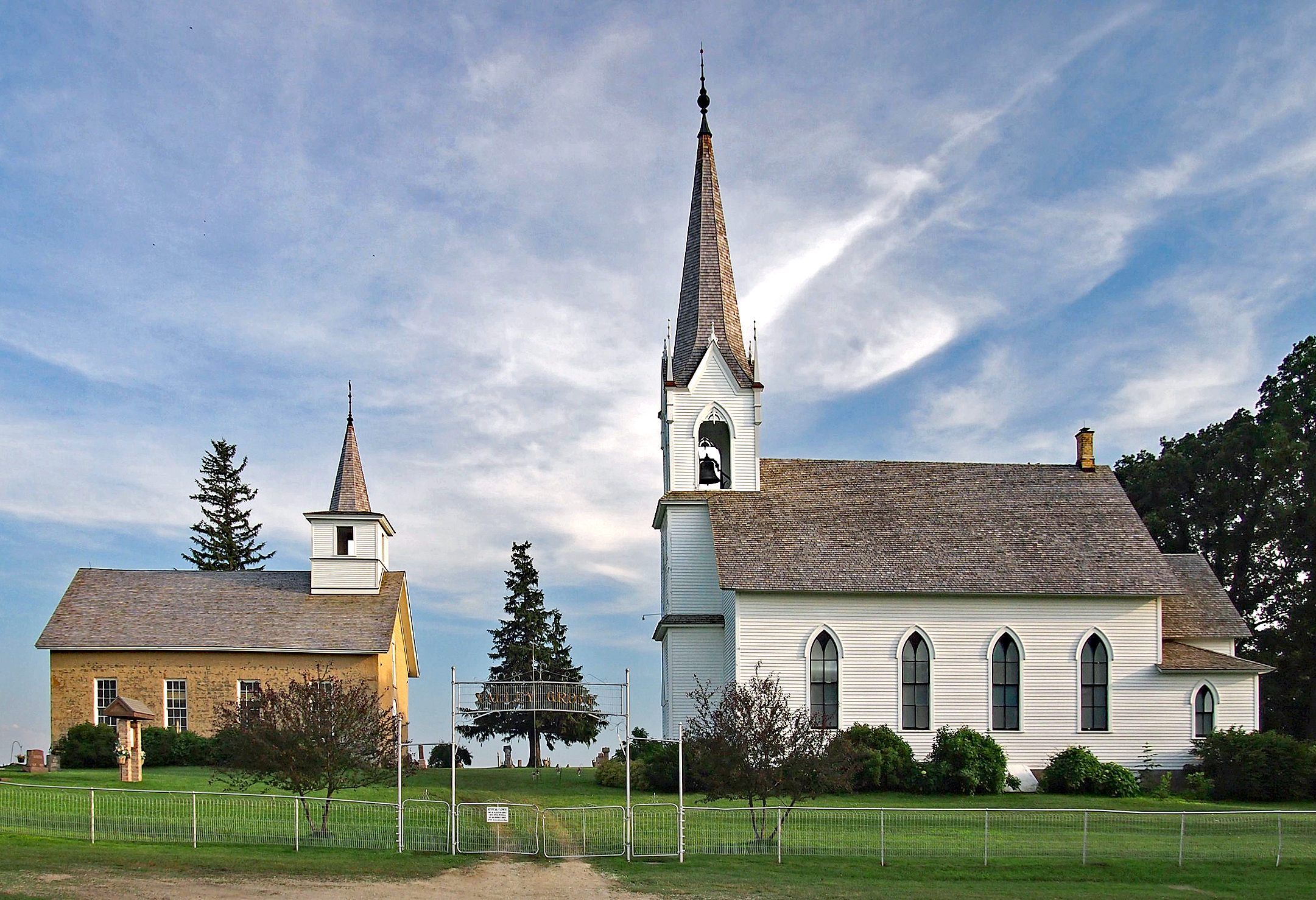
- Valley Grove historic churches in Wheeling Township

- Location within the state of Minnesota
- Coordinates: 44°19′11″N 93°5′27″W
- Country: United States
- State: Minnesota
- County: Rice

Area
  - Total: 34.6 sq mi (89.7 km^{2})
  - Land: 34.6 sq mi (89.7 km^{2})
  - Water: 0 sq mi (0.0 km^{2})
- Elevation: 1,184 ft (361 m)

Population (2000)
  - Total: 541
  - Density: 16/sq mi (6/km^{2})
- Time zone: UTC-6 (Central (CST))
  - Summer (DST): UTC-5 (CDT)
- ZIP code: 55053
- Area code: 507
- FIPS code: 27-69862
- GNIS feature ID: 0665979

Wheeling Township is a rural township in Rice County, Minnesota, United States. The population was 541 at the 2000 census.

The first permanent settlement at Wheeling Township was made circa 1855.

== Geography ==
According to the United States Census Bureau, the township has a total area of 34.6 square miles (89.7 km^{2}), all land.

The southern half of the township is flat, and land use is agricultural. The northern half is made up of rolling hills, and land use is predominantly rural and residential.

Prairie Creek is the most prominent drainage system. The entire township is part of the Cannon River watershed.

Nerstrand-Big Woods State Park is located in Wheeling Township.

== Demographics ==
As of the census of 2000, there were 541 people, 176 households, and 145 families residing in the township. The population density was 15.6 people per square mile (6.0 people/km^{2}). There were 178 housing units at an average density of 5.1 units per square mile (2.0 units/km^{2}).

The racial makeup of the township was 98.89% White, 0.37% African American, 0.37% Native American, 0.18% Pacific Islander, and 0.18% from two or more races.

The northernmost portion of the township was originally settled by Norwegian immigrants, while the balance was originally settled by German immigrants. Much of the land is still farmed by families whose ancestors settled the area in the late 19th century. Main Street in Nerstrand, Minnesota, extended westward, formed the dividing line.

There were 176 households, out of which 47.7% had children under the age of 18 living with them, 72.2% were married couples living together, 2.8% had a female householder with no husband present, and 17.6% were non-families. 13.6% of all households were made up of individuals, and 5.7% had someone living alone who was 65 years of age or older. The average household size was 3.06 and the average family size was 3.41.

In the township the population was spread out, with 32.5% under the age of 18, 7.4% from 18 to 24, 34.0% from 25 to 44, 19.0% from 45 to 64, and 7.0% who were 65 years of age or older. The median age was 35 years. For every 100 females, there were 104.2 males. For every 100 females age 18 and over, there were 116.0 males.

The median income for a household in the township was $48,056, and the median income for a family was $49,583. Males had a median income of $33,462 versus $30,000 for females. The per capita income for the township was $17,944. About 4.1% of families and 5.7% of the population were below the poverty line, including 7.2% of those under age 18 and 5.7% of those age 65 or over.
