= Minnesota State Highway 273 =

State highway in Minnesota, United States

Trunk Highway 273
- MN 273 highlighted in red

Route information
- Maintained by MnDOT
- Length: 4.004 mi (6.444 km)
- Existed: 1949–2004

Major junctions
- South end: MN 19 / MN 67 / CSAH 7 at Kintire–Sheridian township line
- North end: CSAH 9 / CSAH 7 in Belview

Location
- Country: United States
- State: Minnesota
- Counties: Redwood

Highway system
- Minnesota Trunk Highway System; Interstate; US; State; Legislative; Scenic
← MN 271	→ MN 274

Minnesota State Highway 273 (MN 273) was a short state highway in Redwood County. It ran from its intersection with MN 19/MN 67 to its intersection with County State-Aid Highway 9 (CSAH 9) in Belview. The route was decommissioned in 2004 and became an extension of Redwood County State-Aid Highway 7 (CSAH 7).

== Route description ==
MN 273 served as a north–south connector route between the city of Belview and MN 19/MN 67. The entire route was located in Redwood County.

== History ==
Highway 273 was authorized in 1949.

It was removed in 2004 and became an extension of Redwood County State-Aid Highway 7 (CSAH 7).

== Major intersections ==
The entire highway was in Redwood County.

Location	mi	km	Destinations	Notes
Sheridan–Kintire township line	0.000	0.000	MN 19 / MN 67 – Vesta, Redwood Falls CSAH 7 south – Seaforth	Southern terminus; roadway continued south as CSAH 7
Belview	4.004	6.444	CSAH 9 – Echo CSAH 7 north – Sacred Heart	Northern terminus; roadway continued north as CSAH 7
1.000 mi = 1.609 km; 1.000 km = 0.621 mi
