= Raymond Cox =

American politician

Raymond "Ray" Cox

Member of the Minnesota House of Representatives from the 25B district
- In office 2003–2007
- Preceded by: John Tuma
- Succeeded by: David Bly

Personal details
- Born: June 26, 1951 Stockton, California
- Died: November 3, 2017 (aged 67) Northfield, Minnesota
- Party: Republican Party of Minnesota
- Spouse: Ellen (Bjork) Cox
- Children: 3
- Occupation: Business owner
- Website: http://raycox.net

Raymond R. Cox (June 26, 1951 – November 3, 2017) was a Minnesota politician and a former member of the Minnesota House of Representatives from District 25B, which includes the communities of Belle Plaine, Bridgewater, Cedar Lake, Dundas, Erin, Forest, Helena, Lonsdale, Nerstrand, Northfield, Shieldsville, Webster, Wheatland and Wheeling, as well as several townships in Rice and Scott counties just south of the Twin Cities metropolitan area.

== Early life and career ==
Cox was born in Stockton, California, to parents who were Minnesota natives. The family moved back to Minnesota when he was a young boy. He grew up in Northfield, where he graduated from Northfield High School in 1970. He attended Ripon College for two years and received his B.A. in biology (with a concentration in plant pathology) from St. Olaf College in 1974. During college, Cox began to work in construction and continued in this field after graduation. Eventually, he joined Northfield Construction Company and has been sole owner of the business since 1996. Cox died from cancer at his home in Northfield, Minnesota.

== Political career ==
Before his election to the Minnesota Legislature in 2002, Cox served on the Northfield City Planning Commission for five years (1978–1983) and on the Northfield Board of Education for 15 years, beginning in 1987.

Cox was elected to the Minnesota State Legislature on November 5, 2002, and served two terms (2003–2007). During that time, his committee assignments included:

- Environment & Natural Resources
- Higher Education Finance
- Transportation

Cox was a board member of the Northfield Community Action Center and Northfield Area Foundation.

== Personal life ==
Cox lived in Northfield with his wife, Ellen. They have three grown children.

Cox's great-grandfather, Edwin Cox (b. 1837), served in the Minnesota State Legislature from 1889-90 as the State Representative from District 41 (Pope County). His mother, Marjorie Cox, a teacher and long time Northfield City Councilperson, ran unsuccessfully for state representative in 1978 in the old District 24A against former Minnesota Speaker of the House, Rep. Robert E. Vanasek.

Preceded by John Tuma	Minnesota House of Representatives District 25B; 2003 – 2007	Succeeded by David Bly
