= Christdala Evangelical Swedish Lutheran Church =

Historic church in Minnesota, United States

- U.S. National Register of Historic Places
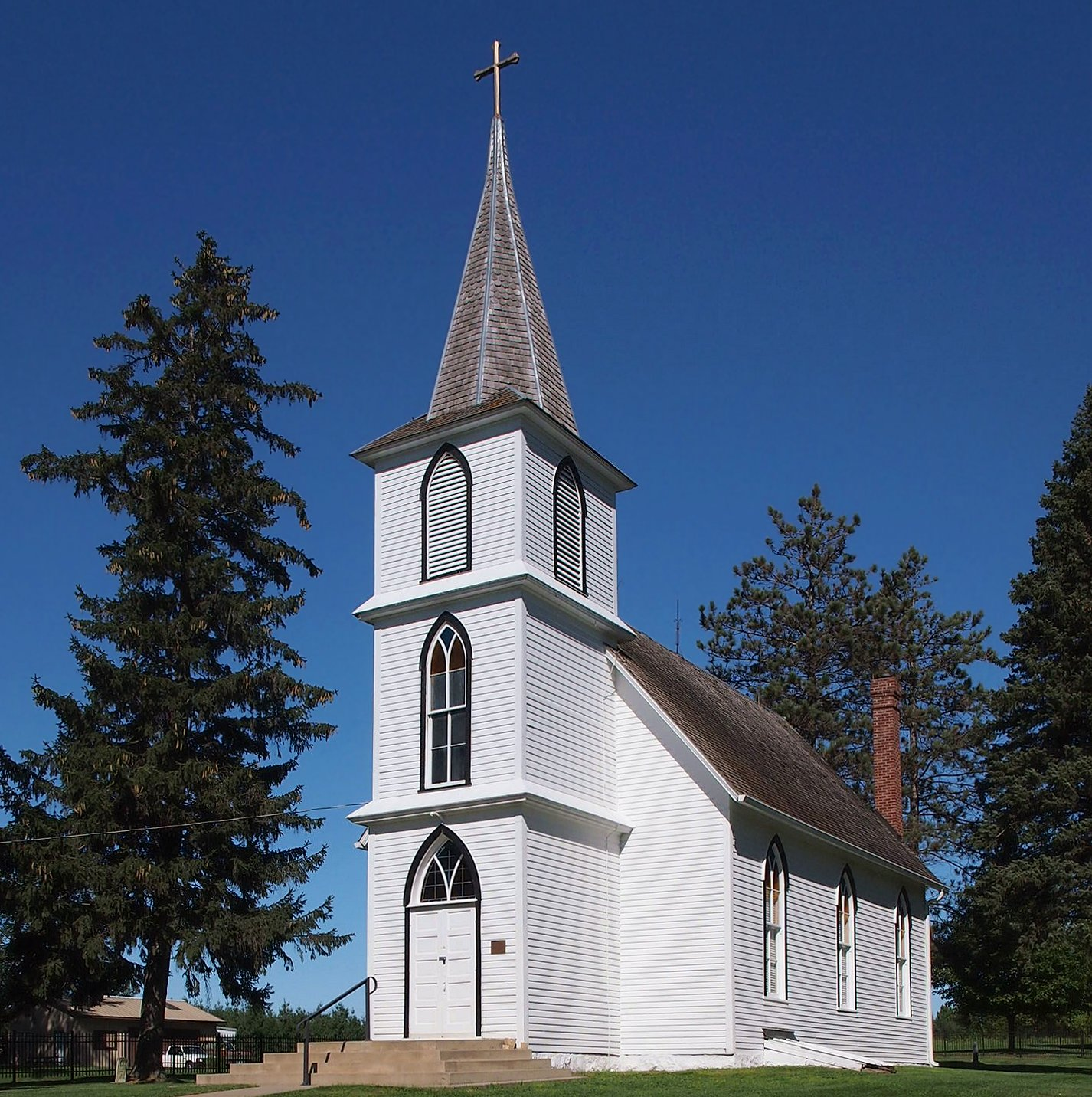
- Christdala Evangelical Swedish Lutheran Church from the southeast

- Location within Minnesota Location within the United States
- Location: 4695 Millersburg Blvd., Forest Township
- Nearest city: Lonsdale, Minnesota
- Coordinates: 44°25′59″N 93°21′26″W
- Built: 1878
- Architect: John Olson
- Architectural style: Gothic Revival
- NRHP reference No.: 95000617
- Added to NRHP: May 18, 1995

Christdala Evangelical Swedish Lutheran Church (Den Svenska Evangeliska Lutherska Christdala Församlingen) is a historic church located in Forest Township, Rice County, Minnesota. It is situated 11 miles (18 km) west of Northfield at 4695 Millersburg Blvd.

The church was listed on the National Register of Historic Places by the United States Department of the Interior in 1995 because of its historical significance and its ties to the Northfield, Minnesota bank robbery by the James-Younger Gang on September 7, 1876.

== History ==
Swedish immigrants had been present in the Millersburg area since 1870, but did not have their own church, holding services in their homes. In 1876, Nicolaus Gustafson, was killed in Northfield, Minnesota, when the James-Younger Gang robbed the Northfield bank. Gustafson's death led the Swedish community in Millersburg to begin planning the construction of their own church and cemetery.

Christdala congregation was formed on July 18, 1877 by 13 founding families on 1.125 acres (0.455 ha) of land given by neighbours Peter Youngquist and Carl Hirdler. Christdala was admitted into the Minnesota Conference of the Lutheran Augustana Synod. The church building was constructed in 1878 for $230 by John Olson and John Lundberg of Northfield. In 1880, annual membership dues were $4.00 for men, $3.00 for women, and the church building had an insured value of $600.00. The pulpit, lamps, front steps, baptismal font, organ, carpet, window shades, burial equipment, bell and bell tower, and furnace would be installed over the next decades.

In 1885, Christdala adopted its church constitution. Over 55% of Christdala's budget was dedicated to education. The church records stated: "The fruit of a surrendered life becomes capable of sacrificing personal advantages for the sake and welfare of the group." Membership peaked at 230 members in 1890.

In 1903, the church began offering English services once a month on Sunday afternoon or evening. The church adopted English as its only language in 1917.

By 1938, fewer than six pioneer families remained in the Christdala community. Membership continued to decline until 1966, when the congregation was disestablished.

== Preservation ==
In 1994, Christdala Church Preservation & Cemetery Association incorporated as an IRS-approved charitable organization for tax-deductible gifts. Substantial funds raised to preserve the church with new paint, roof, windows, fence, front steps, flag poles. The church was formally placed on the National Register of Historic Places in 1995, with Lieutenant Governor Joanne Benson officiating on the official induction ceremony.

In 2007, Christdala acquired the Millersburg Schoolhouse, built in 1881, for use as a records repository and community museum.

== Related reading ==
- Quist, B. Wayne (1996) The History of the Christdala Evangelical Lutheran Church (Dundas, Minnesota: Small World Press)
