= Minnesota State Highway 19 =

State highway in Minnesota, United States

Trunk Highway 19
- MN 19 highlighted in red

Route information
- Maintained by MnDOT
- Length: 207.877 mi (334.546 km)
- Existed: 1933–present
- Tourist routes: Minnesota River Valley Scenic Byway

Major junctions
- West end: SD 30 near Hendricks
- US 75 at Ivanhoe; US 59 / MN 23 at Marshall; US 71 at Redwood Falls; MN 5 / MN 22 at Gaylord; US 169 near Henderson; MN 13 / MN 21 at New Prague; I-35 near Lonsdale, Little Chicago; MN 3 at Northfield; US 52 / MN 20 at Cannon Falls
- East end: US 61 at Red Wing

Location
- Country: United States
- State: Minnesota
- Counties: Lincoln, Lyon, Redwood, Renville, Sibley, Le Sueur, Scott, Rice, Dakota, Goodhue

Highway system
- Minnesota Trunk Highway System; Interstate; US; State; Legislative; Scenic
← MN 18	→ MN 20

Minnesota State Highway 19 (MN 19) is a 207.877-mile-long (334.546 km) highway in southern Minnesota, which runs from South Dakota Highway 30 at the South Dakota state line near Ivanhoe and continues east to its eastern terminus at its intersection with U.S. Highway 61 in Red Wing.

The route essentially crosses the state of Minnesota, ending at Red Wing, about five miles (8 km) west of the bridge to Wisconsin.

== Route description ==
State Highway 19 serves as an east–west route between Ivanhoe, Marshall, Redwood Falls, New Prague, Northfield, Cannon Falls, and Red Wing in southwest and southeast Minnesota.

Highway 19 parallels U.S. Highway 14 and U.S. Highway 212 for part of its route.

The route passes through the Richard J. Dorer State Forest in Goodhue County.

The Rush River State Wayside Park is located on Highway 19 in Sibley County. The park is located west of Henderson.

== History ==
State Highway 19 was authorized in 1933.

The last section of Highway 19 to be paved was in the mid-1950s, east of New Prague.

The stretch of Highway 19 between Red Wing and Gaylord was established as the Colvill Memorial Highway in 1931, and is still known by that name today. It is named in honor of Colonel William J. Colvill, who led the 1st Minnesota Volunteer Infantry in the Battle of Gettysburg.

A new interchange was constructed in 2002 at the junction of Highway 19 and U.S. Highway 169 near Henderson.

== Major intersections ==
County	Location	mi	km	Destinations	Notes
Lincoln	Hendricks Township	0.000	0.000	SD 30 west – White	Continuation into South Dakota
Lincoln	Hendricks Township	2.331	3.751	MN 271 north / CSAH 1 – Hendricks	
Lincoln	Ivanhoe	10.395	16.729	US 75 – Lake Benton, Canby	
Lyon	Marshall	34.786	55.983	US 59 / MN 68 west	Western end of MN 68 overlap
Lyon	Marshall	36.472– 36.487	58.696– 58.720	MN 23 – Pipestone, Granite Falls	
Redwood	Westline Township	46.596	74.989	MN 68 east – Milroy	Eastern end of MN 68 overlap
Yellow Medicine–Redwood county line	Echo–Vesta township line	57.360	92.312	MN 67 west – Echo, Granite Falls	Western end of MN 67 overlap
Redwood	Kintire–Sheridan township line	61.644	99.206	CSAH 7 – Belview, Seaforth	Formerly MN 273
Redwood	Redwood Falls	72.087	116.013	US 71 south / MN 67 east	Eastern end of MN 67 overlap; western end of US 71 overlap
Minnesota River		78.232– 78.302	125.902– 126.015	US 71 Bridge	
Renville	Morton	78.498	126.330	US 71 north / Minnesota River Valley Scenic Byway – Olivia	Eastern end of US 71 overlap
Renville	Birch Cooley Township	81.226	130.721	CR 51 / Minnesota River Valley Scenic Byway	
Renville	Fairfax	92.983	149.642	MN 4 – Sleepy Eye, Hector	
Sibley	Winthrop	109.722	176.580	MN 15 – New Ulm, Hutchinson	
Sibley	Gaylord	117.411	188.955	MN 22 north / MN 5 ends – Glencoe	Western end of MN 5/MN 22 overlap
Sibley	Gaylord			MN 22 south – St. Peter	Eastern end of MN 22 overlap
Sibley	Gaylord	118.772	191.145	MN 5 east – Arlington	Eastern end of MN 5 overlap
Sibley	Henderson	134.078	215.778	MN 93 / CSAH 6 / Minnesota River Valley Scenic Byway	
Minnesota River		134.387– 134.479	216.275– 216.423	Highway 19 Bridge	
Scott–Le Sueur county line	Blakeley–Tyrone township line	137.727	221.650	US 169 – Mankato, Minneapolis	Interchange
Scott–Le Sueur county line	New Prague	150.832	242.741	MN 13 south / MN 21	Western end of MN 13 overlap
Scott–Rice county line	Cedar Lake–Wheatland township line	154.886– 154.892	249.265– 249.275	MN 13 north – Prior Lake, Savage	Eastern end of MN 13 overlap
Rice	Webster Township	169.248	272.378	CSAH 46 south / I-35 Alt. south	Western end of CSAH 46 and Alternate I-35 overlap
Rice	Webster Township	169.335– 169.438	272.518– 272.684	I-35 – Minneapolis, St. Paul, Faribault	I-35 exit 69; interchange.
Rice	Webster Township	169.481	272.753	CSAH 46 north / CR 59 / I-35 Alt. north	Eastern end of CSAH 46 and Alternate I-35 overlap
Dakota	No major junctions				
Rice	Northfield	176.202	283.570	MN 3 south to MN 246 – Faribault	South end of MN 3 overlap
Rice	Northfield	176.466	283.994	MN 3 north	North end of MN 3 overlap
Dakota	No major junctions				
Goodhue	Stanton Township	184.328	296.647	MN 56 south – Kenyon	South end of MN 56 overlap
Goodhue	Stanton Township	185.331	298.261	MN 56 north – Hampton	North end of MN 56 overlap
Goodhue	Cannon Falls	190.478	306.545	US 52 – Rochester, St. Paul	Interchange
Goodhue	Cannon Falls	191.108	307.559	MN 20 / CSAH 20	
Goodhue	Red Wing	207.572	334.055	US 61 / Great River Road – Red Wing, Hastings	
1.000 mi = 1.609 km; 1.000 km = 0.621 mi: Concurrency terminus
