= Wheatland, Minnesota =

Wheatland
- Unincorporated community
- Location within Minnesota Location within the United States
- Coordinates: 44°27′53″N 93°29′01″W
- Country: United States
- State: Minnesota
- County: Rice County
- Township: Wheatland Township
- Elevation: 1,053 ft (321 m)
- Time zone: UTC-6 (Central (CST))
  - Summer (DST): UTC-5 (CDT)
- ZIP code: 56069
- Area code: 507
- GNIS feature ID: 655007

Wheatland is an unincorporated community in Wheatland Township, Rice County, Minnesota, United States.

The community is located along Union Lake Trail, near its junctions with Jennings Avenue and Kent Avenue.

Nearby places include Lonsdale, Veseli, Montgomery, New Prague, and Millersburg.

Historical population
Census	Pop.	Note	%±
1900	135		—
1910	85		−37.0%
U.S. Decennial Census
