= Veseli, Minnesota =

Veseli
- Unincorporated community
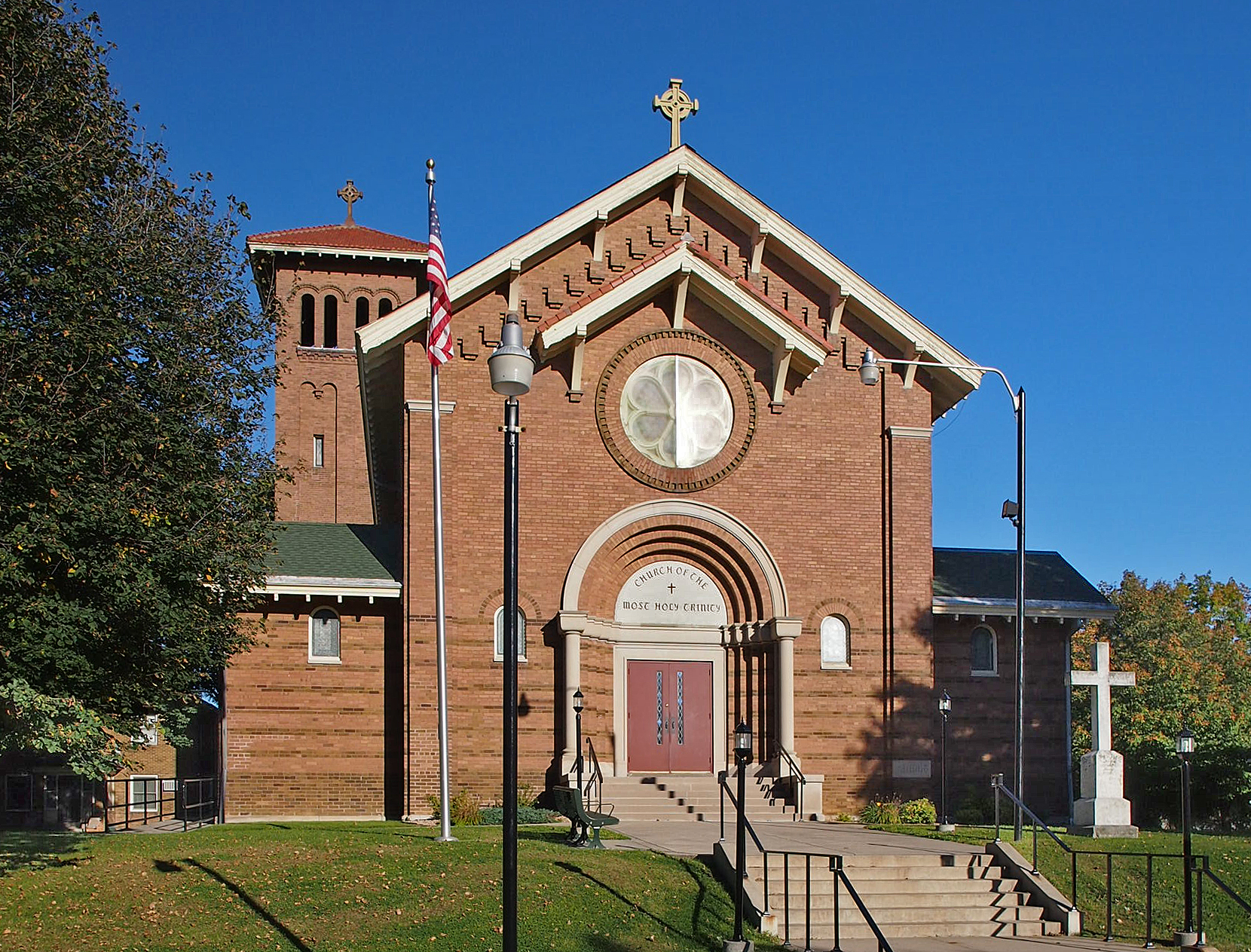
- Church of the Most Holy Trinity

- Location within Minnesota Location within the United States
- Coordinates: 44°30′54″N 93°27′36″W
- Country: United States
- State: Minnesota
- County: Rice County
- Township: Wheatland Township
- Elevation: 1,076 ft (328 m)
- Time zone: UTC-6 (Central (CST))
  - Summer (DST): UTC-5 (CDT)
- ZIP code: 55046
- Area code: 507
- GNIS feature ID: 653643

Veseli is an unincorporated community in Wheatland Township, Rice County, Minnesota, United States. The community was incorporated in 1889. It was named after Veselí nad Lužnicí, in the Czech Republic (South Bohemia), a city whence its early settlers came. Veseli was one of the four largest communities in Minnesota originally settled by Czech immigrants.

The community is located along Rice County Road 6 (50th Street West) near its junction with Jackson Avenue.

State Highway 19 (MN 19) is in the immediate area, to the east and also to the north. Veseli is located within ZIP code 55046 based in Lonsdale.

Nearby places include Lonsdale, New Prague, Webster, and Wheatland.

Veseli is the home of the Church of the Most Holy Trinity, known as an architectural landmark for its brick exterior and Italian Romanesque interior.

Historical population
Census	Pop.	Note	%±
1890	182		—
1900	249		36.8%
1910	235		−5.6%
1920	179		−23.8%
U.S. Decennial Census
