= Church of the Annunciation (Webster Township, Minnesota) =

Church building in Webster Township, United States of America

- Church of the Annunciation--Catholic
- U.S. National Register of Historic Places
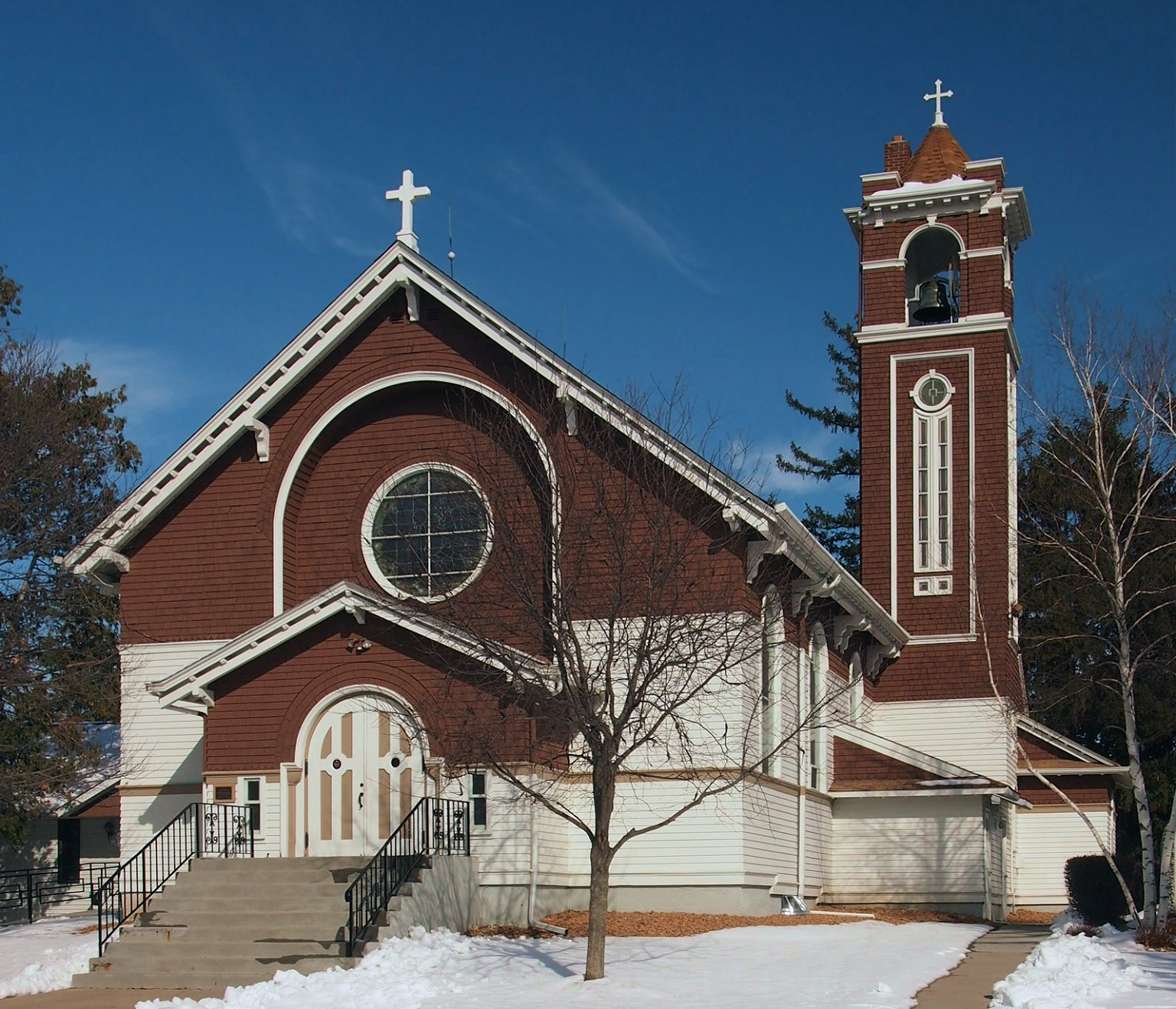
- The Church of the Annunciation from the west-southwest

- Location within Minnesota Location within the United States
- Location: 4996 Hazelwood Avenue; Hazelwood, Minnesota
- Coordinates: 44°30′55.7″N 93°17′13.5″W
- Area: less than one acre
- Built: 1913
- Built by: Joseph Kump
- Architect: John Wheeler
- Architectural style: American Craftsman
- MPS: Rice County MRA
- NRHP reference No.: 82003033
- Added to NRHP: April 6, 1982

The Church of the Annunciation is a church in Rice County, Minnesota in Webster Township near Northfield. It was designed by John Wheeler, in the Craftsman style, and has an ornamental corner tower. A study of historic properties in Rice County says that its architecture also includes Shingle Style. The church was originally opened in 1853, and after a lightning strike burned down the original chapel, the current chapel was built and completed in 1913. It continues to operate to this day.

== Gallery ==
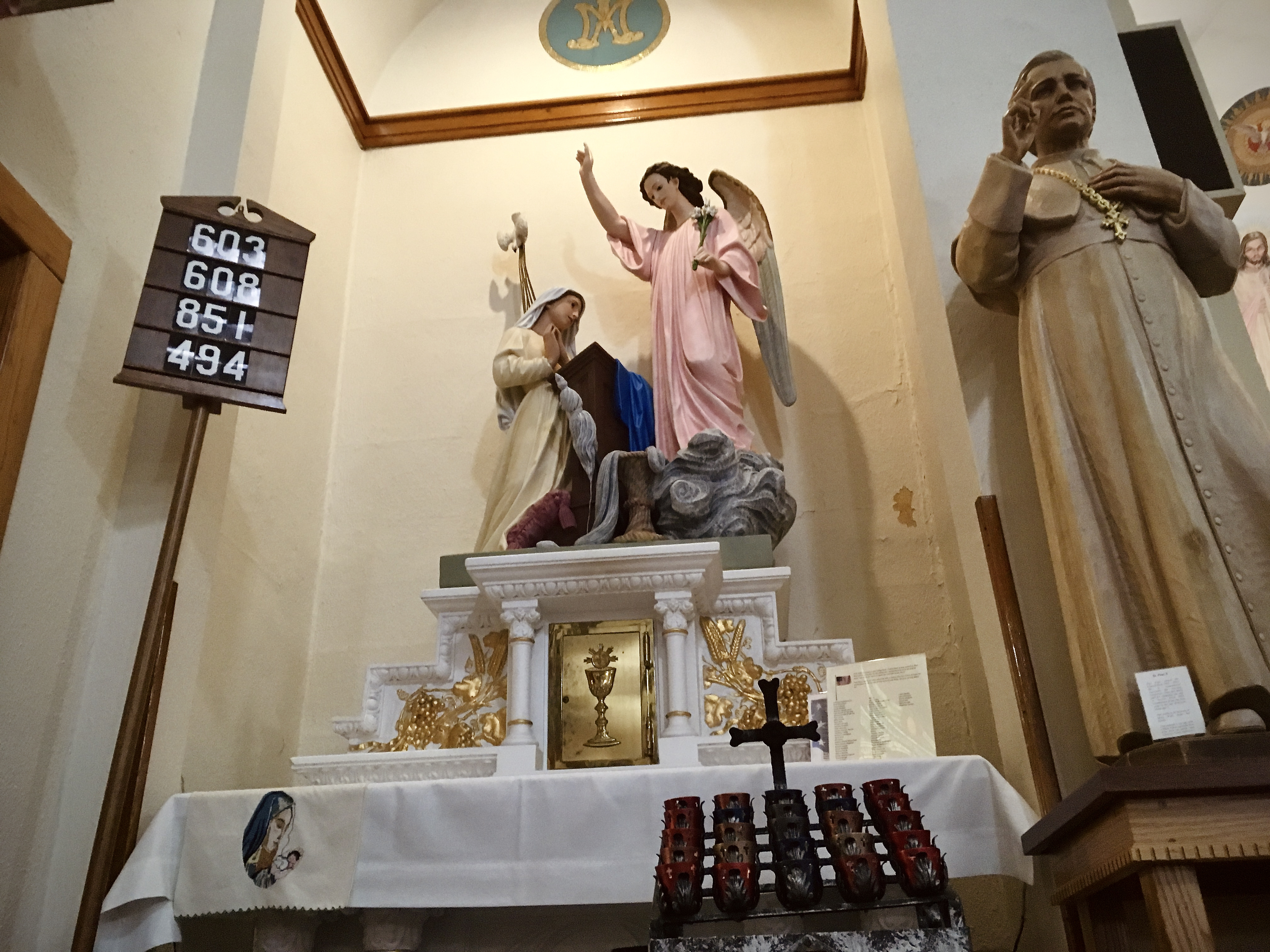
Wood carve statues to the side of the altar.

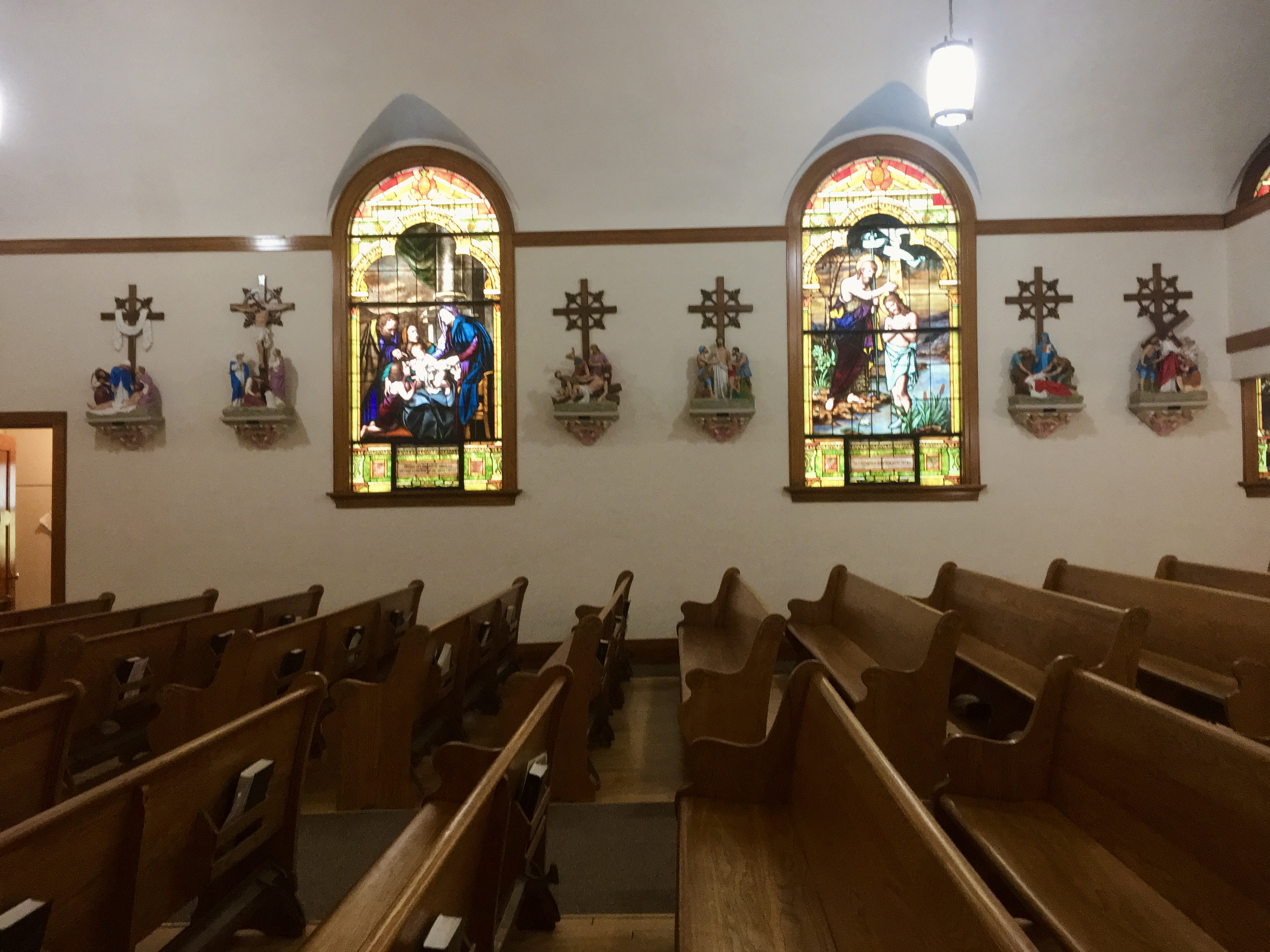
Stain glass windows in the chapel.

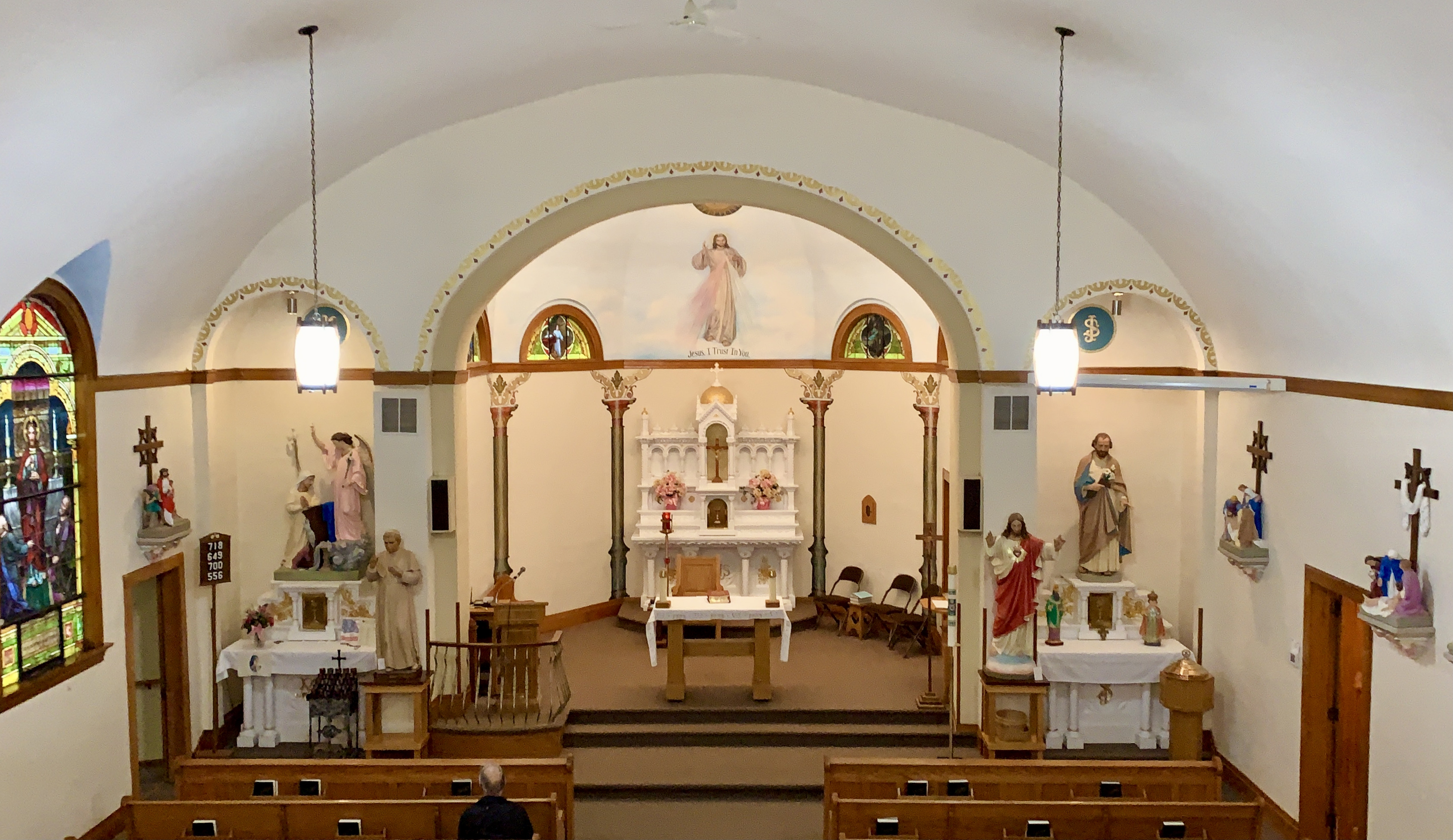
Main altar from the choir loft.

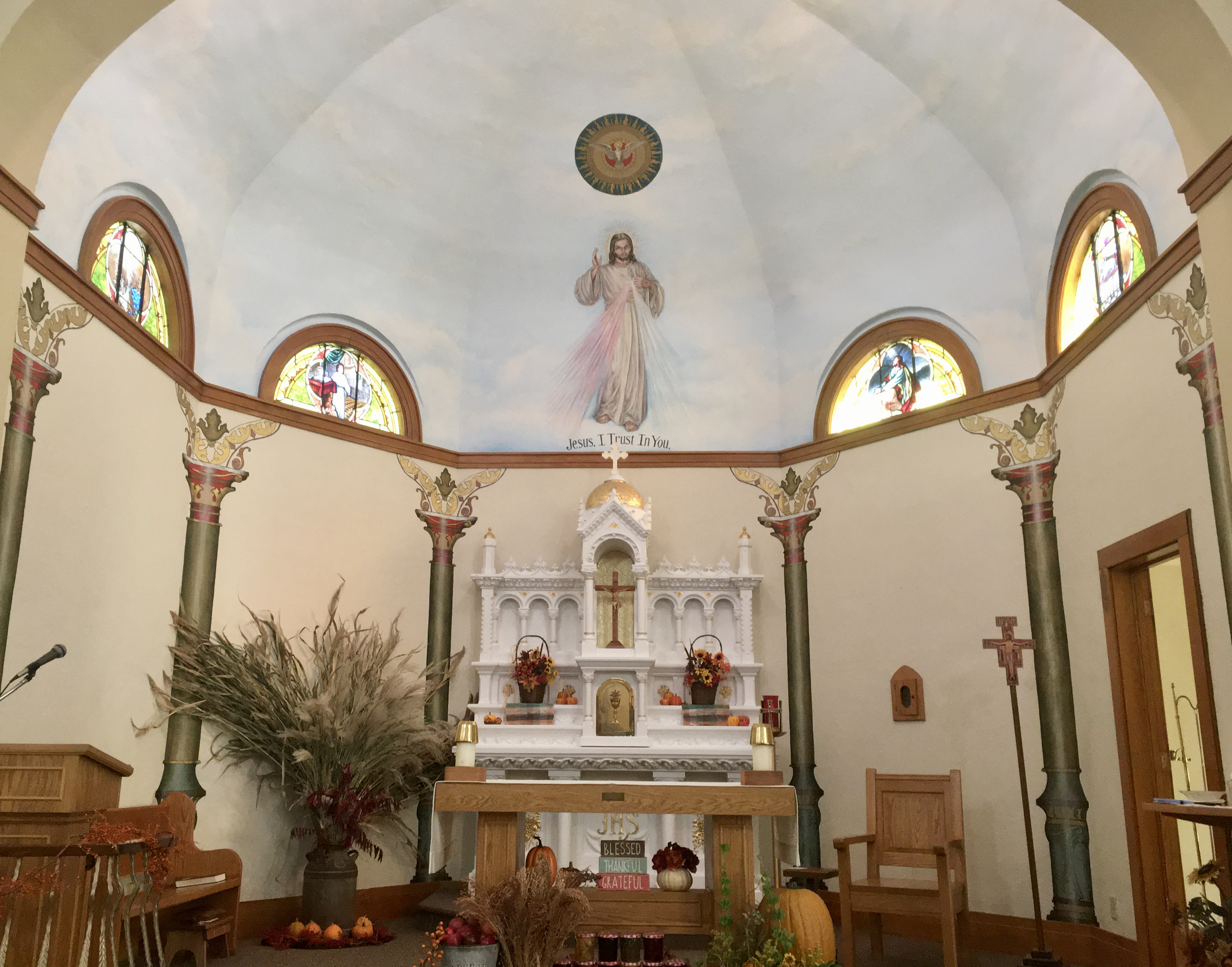
Main altar with fall decorations set up by the parishioners.

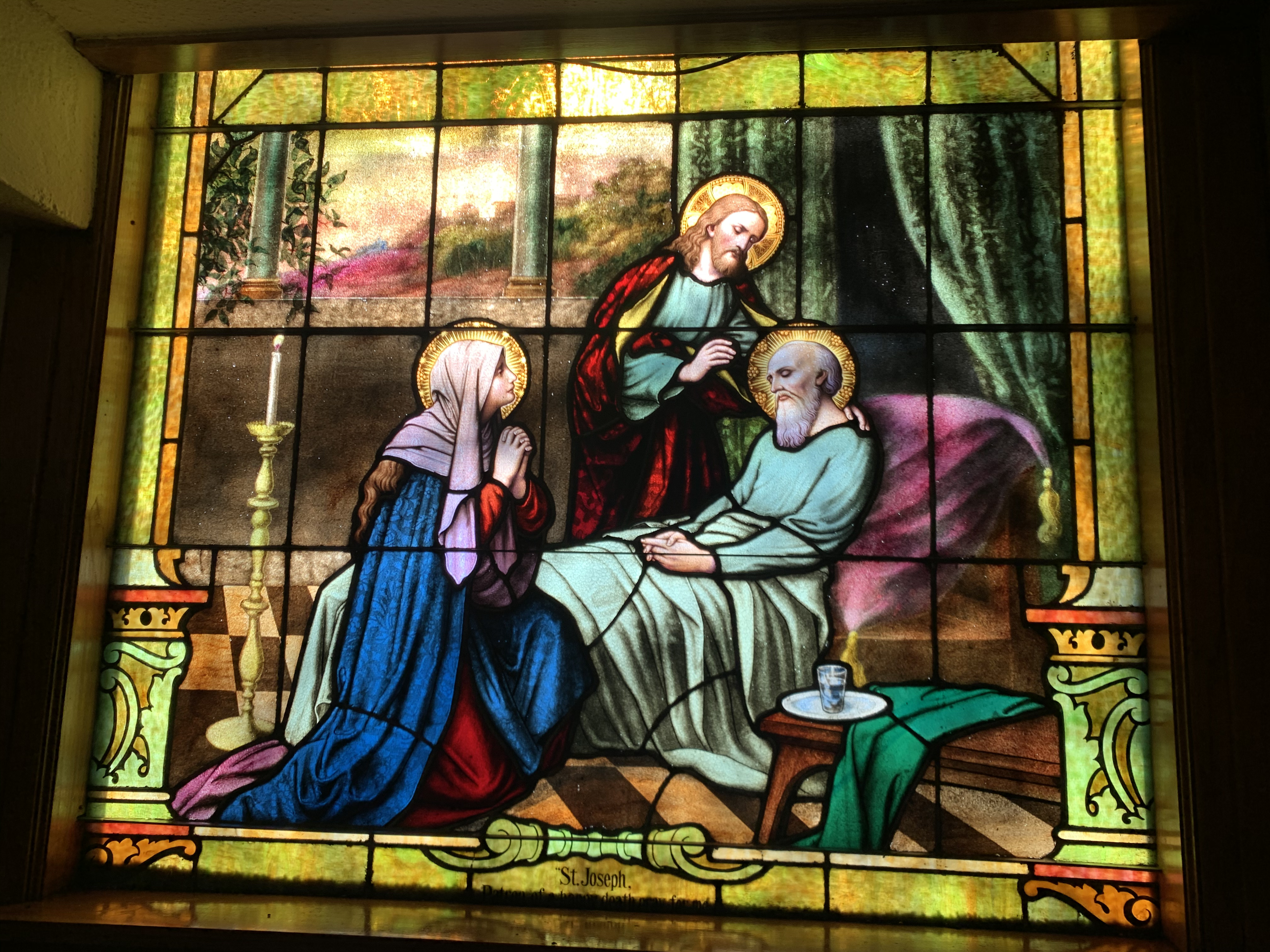
Close up of one of the stain glass windows, where St Joseph lies with Jesus and Mary.

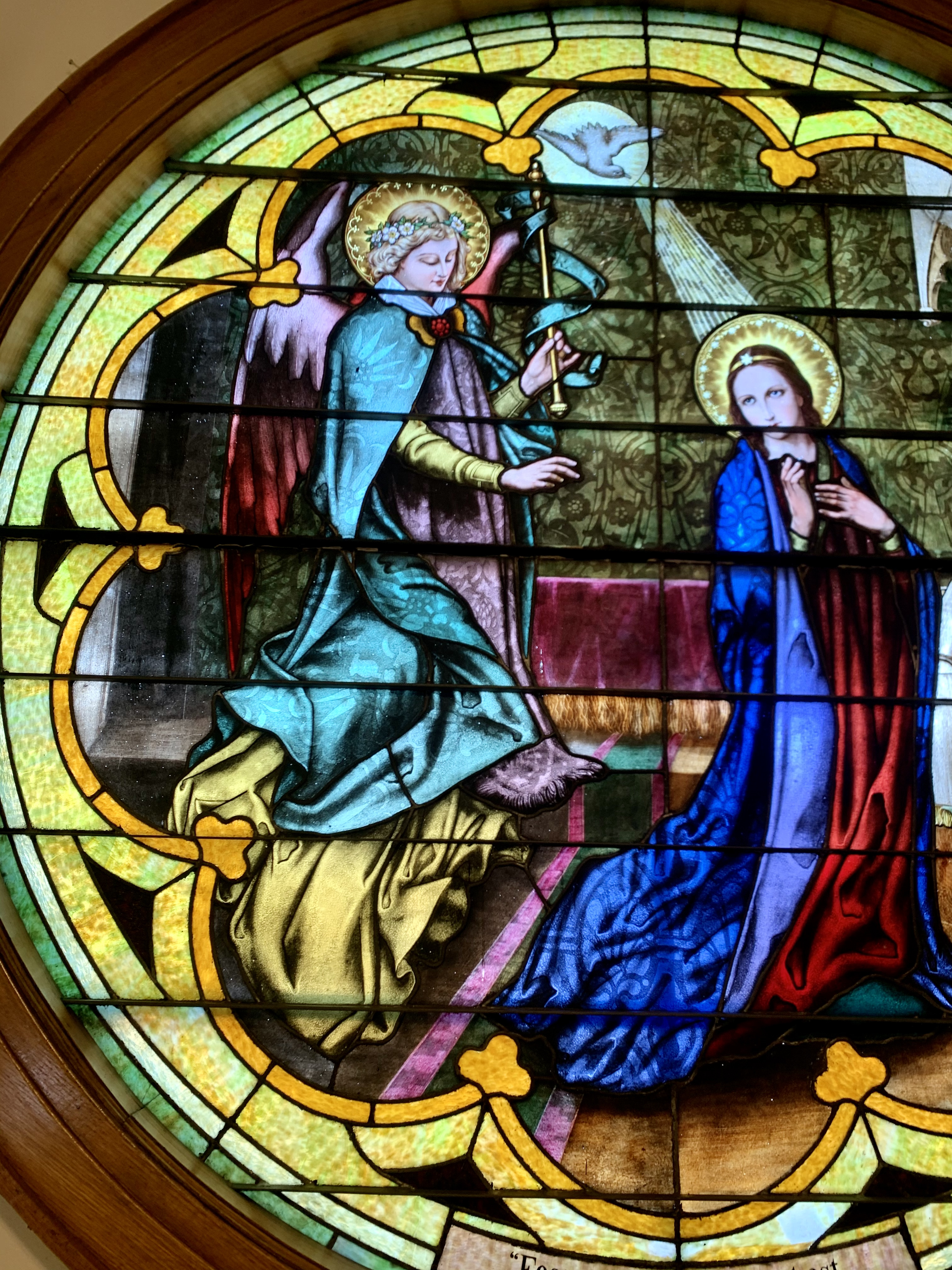
Close up of the forward-most stain glass window, depicting the Annunciation.

== See also ==
- National Register of Historic Places listings in Rice County, Minnesota
