= Church of the Most Holy Trinity, Veseli =

Historic church in Minnesota, United States

- Church of the Most Holy Trinity (Catholic)
- U.S. National Register of Historic Places
- U.S. Historic district
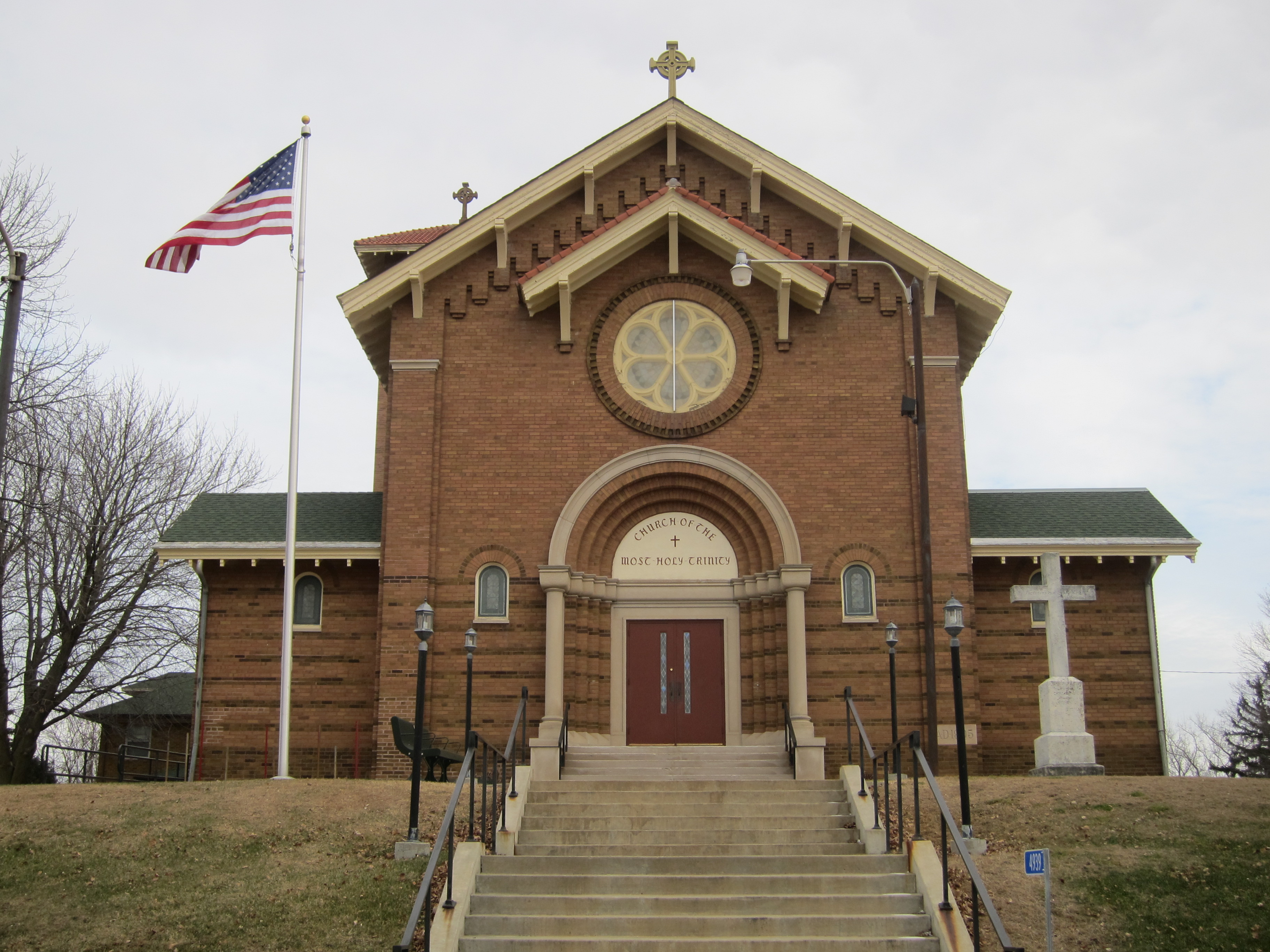

- Location within Minnesota Location within the United States
- Nearest city: Veseli, Minnesota
- Coordinates: 44°30′57″N 93°27′35″W
- Area: less than one acre
- Built: 1905
- Built by: Mohlke, Ernest
- Architect: Clarence H. Johnston, Sr.
- Architectural style: Romanesque
- Website: mhtveseli.com
- NRHP reference No.: 97001424
- Added to NRHP: November 13, 1997

The Church of the Most Holy Trinity in Veseli, Minnesota (an unincorporated community in Wheatland Township, Minnesota) is a Catholic church designed by Clarence H. Johnston, Sr. Johnston designed a large number buildings for state institutions in Minnesota, such as the Minnesota State Academy for the Deaf, the University of Minnesota, the former Minnesota Historical Society building, and many others, but churches were not common in his architectural practice.

Veseli was originally settled by Czech immigrants and was one of the four largest such communities in Minnesota. The members formerly worshiped at the parish in New Prague until they organized their own church in 1874. The first building was a wood frame structure built between 1874 and 1878. The present building was built in 1905 and follows an Italian Romanesque style, with some influences of Craftsman architecture as well. It is 110 feet (34 m) by 64 feet (20 m), with a 90 feet (27 m) tall campanile tower on the left rear of the church. The entry has a round rose window with an eave above it, giving the appearance of a canopy.

Besides the church building, the parish has a school building built in 1916 and a convent and rectory built in 1926.
