= Nicholas Gustafson =

Swedish immigrant

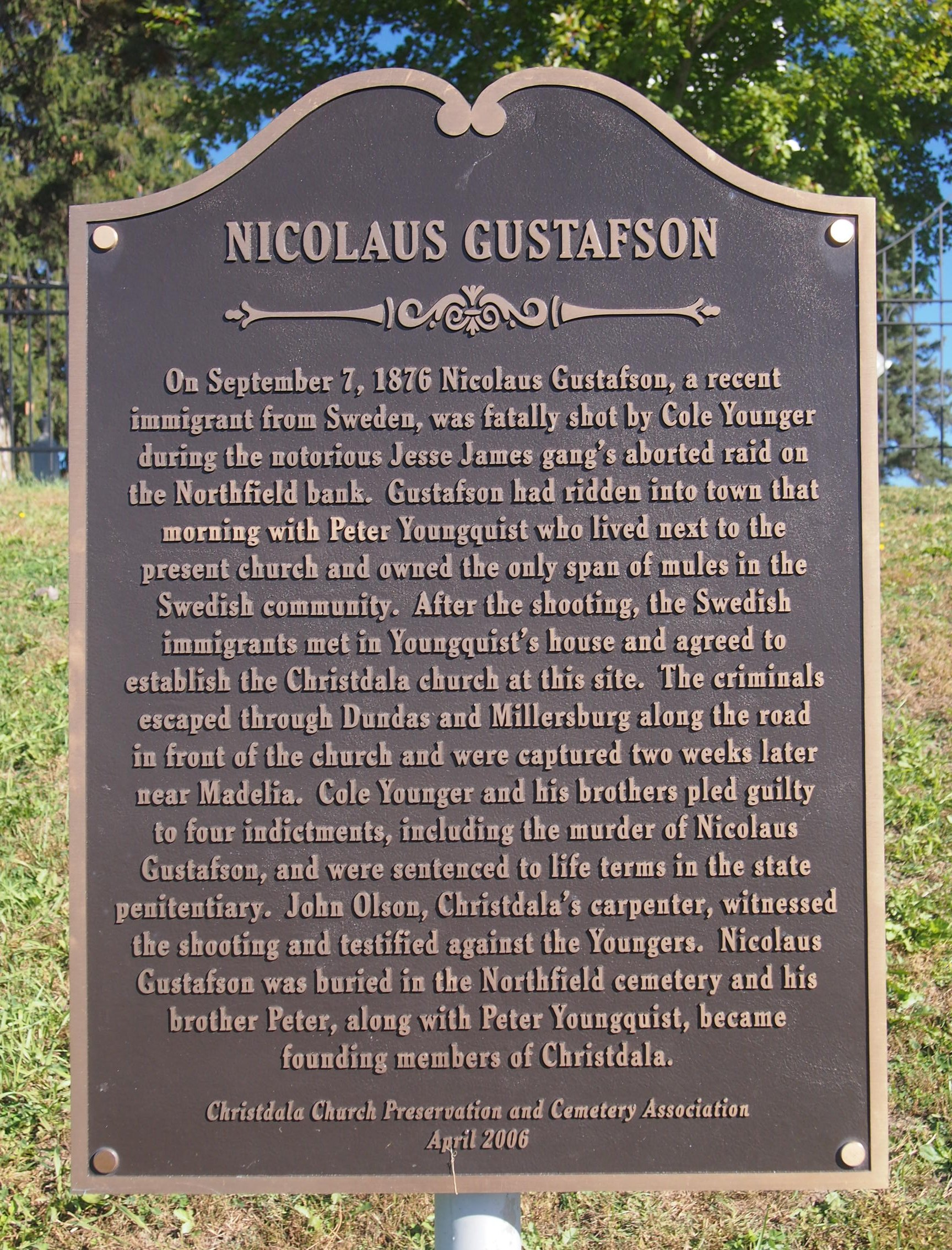
Historical marker commemorating Nicholas Gustafson at the Christdala Evangelical Swedish Lutheran Church

Nicholas Gustafson (August 20, 1846 – September 11, 1876) was a Swedish immigrant who was mortally wounded in the James–Younger Gang bank raid in Northfield, Minnesota. Various sources use alternate spellings of his names including Nicolaus, Nicholaus or Niclas and Gustavson. He was born near Fiddekulla in the parish of Vissefjärda in Kalmar, Sweden.

== Bank raid ==
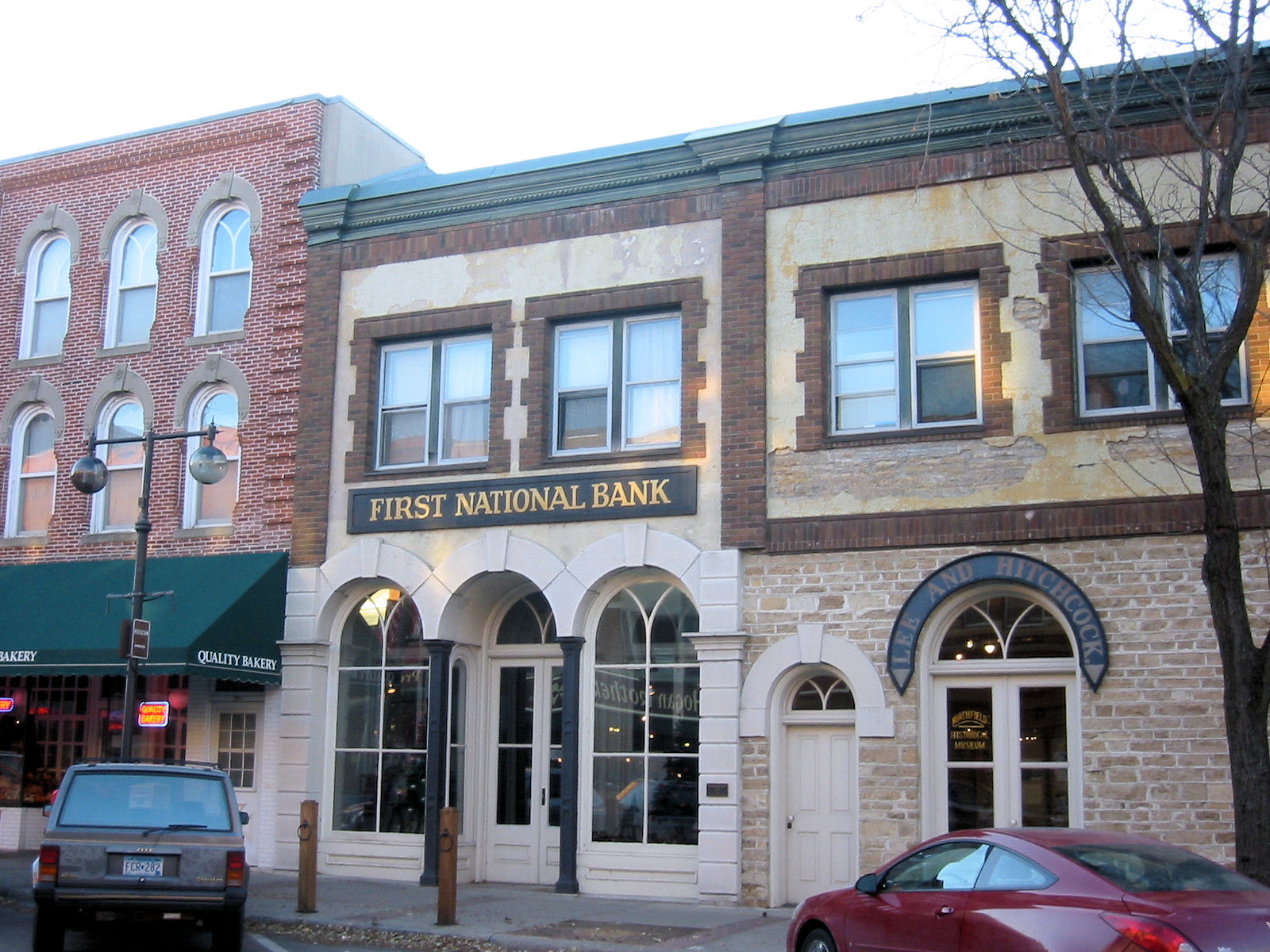
First National Bank building in Northfield; site of the robbery

Gustafson was a recent immigrant to the United States. Swedish emigration records show that "Nicolaus Gustafson" arrived in Faribault, Minnesota on June 9, 1876. Gustafson is known to have settled with his brother's family in the Millersburg, Minnesota area about 12 miles southwest of Northfield and 12 miles northwest of Faribault. At that time, the community was attracting a number of Swedish immigrants.

It is the general consensus that, because of his recent arrival, he didn't speak enough English to understand what was going on during the raid on September 7, 1876. Consequently, when members of the James–Younger Gang were yelling at local citizens to get off the street, he may not have understood them and was mortally wounded during the gun battle.

Cole Younger pleaded guilty to Gustafson's murder (perhaps, in part, to avoid Minnesota's mandated death sentence if he had been convicted of the crime), but claimed he wasn't the primary killer. He later stated "I have always believed that the man Nicholas Gustafson... was hit by a glancing shot from Manning's or Wheeler's rifle. If any of our party shot him, it must have been Woods."

Gustafson died from his wound four days after the raid. John Olson of Northfield was the only eyewitness of the Gustafson murder and testified against the Younger brothers. Olson was from Sweden and was working as a carpenter on a basement door at the corner of Fifth Street and Division (Bierman building). Olson's affidavit was instrumental in refuting Cole Younger's testimony and keeping the Younger brothers in the state penitentiary after repeated parole attempts. For twenty years he received death threats from ex-Confederates in Missouri for his testimony.

Gustafson was buried in the Northfield Cemetery since the Millersburg Swedish-American community had no church or cemetery at that time. After his death, Millersburg Lutherans immediately started planning for the construction of Christdala Evangelical Swedish Lutheran Church. In 1877, John Olson was commissioned to build the Christdala Church.

In 1948, Northfield citizens founded Defeat of Jesse James Days to honor the heroism of Northfield's townspeople. It has become one of the larger of such celebrations in Minnesota. Annually on the anniversary of the death of Nicolaus Gustafson and that of Joseph Lee Heywood, acting cashier at the First National Bank of Northfield, a graveside memorial service is conducted at Northfield Cemetery.

== Related reading ==
- Quist, B. Wayne (1996) The History of the Christdala Evangelical Lutheran Church (Dundas, Minnesota: Small World Press)
- Huntington, George (1986) Robber and Hero: The Story of the Northfield Bank Raid (St. Paul: Minnesota: Historical Society Press) ISBN 9780873511940
- Trenerry, Walter N. (1962,85) Murder in Minnesota, chapter 8: "Highwaymen came riding", Minnesota Historical Society Press
