= Little Chicago, Minnesota =

Little Chicago
- Unincorporated community
- Location within Minnesota Location within the United States
- Coordinates: 44°28′45″N 93°19′20″W
- Country: United States
- State: Minnesota
- County: Rice County
- Township: Webster Township
- Elevation: 1,079 ft (329 m)
- Time zone: UTC-6 (Central (CST))
  - Summer (DST): UTC-5 (CDT)
- ZIP code: 55057
- Area codes: 507 and 952
- GNIS feature ID: 654800

Little Chicago is an unincorporated community in Webster Township, Rice County, Minnesota, United States.

The community is located between Lonsdale and Northfield on State Highway 19 (MN 19). Interstate 35 is nearby.

Knowles Creek flows through the community. The community is located at the junction of Lonsdale Boulevard (MN 19) and Canby Trail.
