= Hazelwood, Minnesota =

Hazelwood
- Unincorporated community
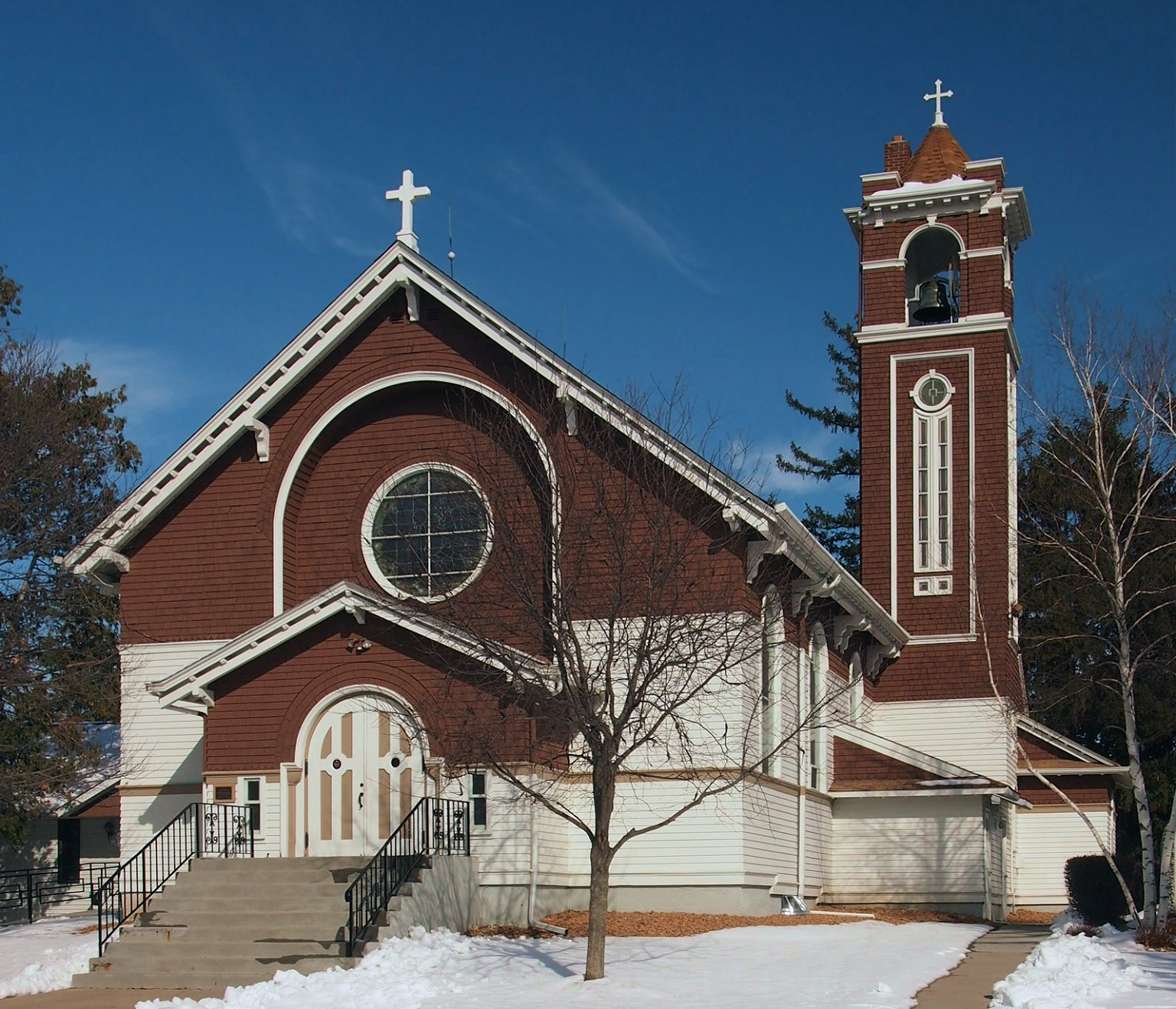
- The Church of the Annunciation in Hazelwood

- Location within Minnesota Location within the United States
- Coordinates: 44°31′21″N 93°17′10″W
- Country: United States
- State: Minnesota
- County: Rice County
- Township: Webster Township
- Elevation: 1,047 ft (319 m)
- Time zone: UTC-6 (Central (CST))
  - Summer (DST): UTC-5 (CDT)
- ZIP code: 55057
- Area code: 952
- GNIS feature ID: 644811

Hazelwood is an unincorporated community in Webster Township, Rice County, Minnesota, United States.

The community is located at the junction of Rice County Roads 3 and 46, near Interstate 35, 15 miles north of Faribault.

Dutch Creek flows through the community. Nearby places also include Lonsdale, Elko New Market, and Northfield.

Hazelwood had a post office from 1857 to 1905, which was operated out of postmaster John J. McCabe's general store.
