= Tri-City United High School =

Location
- 700 4th St NW; Montgomery, MN 56069-0029; United States
- 44.447634°N 93.586940°W

Information
- Type: Public
- Established: 2012
- School district: Tri-City United School District
- Superintendent: Kevin Babcock
- Principal: Alan Fitterer
- Grades: 9–12
- Colors: Silver, Black, Blue
- Athletics conference: Minnesota River Conference
- Mascot: Titan
- Website: hs.tcu2905.us/en-US

Tri-City United High School is a public school located in Montgomery, Minnesota, United States. The school serves the communities of Montgomery, Lonsdale, and Le Center, Minnesota for grades 9–12. This adds up to a student body of 519 students.

== School system ==
The Tri-City United School System consists of Le Center Elementary School in Le Center, Lonsdale Elementary School in Lonsdale, and Montgomery Elementary School and Tri-City United High School in Montgomery. Except for Lonsdale Elementary School, which only serves up to 6th grade, all of the cities in the district have full schooling up to 8th grade after which, students are served by Tri-City United High school.

== History ==
The Tri-City United High School, as it exists today, was built and founded in 2012 following the consolidation of the Le Center and Montgomery-Lonsdale school districts. The current high school building was built on the site of a former Montgomery elementary school to better accommodate the larger student body with academic and athletic opportunities not previously available to either consolidated schools campuses. The current Tri-City United Titans varsity team arose from the merger of The Le Center Wildcats and Montgomery-Lonsdale Redbirds varsity teams.
