= Joseph Lee Heywood =

American murder victim (1837–1867)

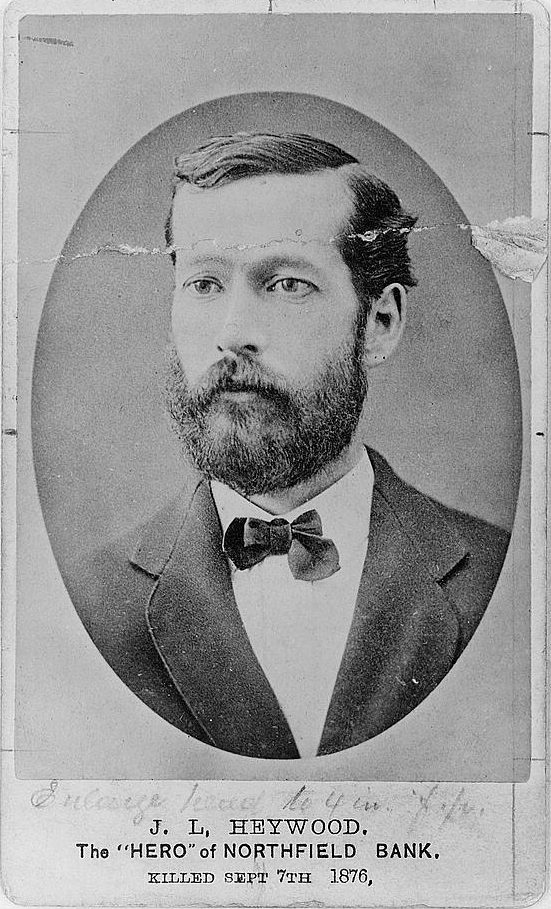

Joseph Lee Heywood (August 12, 1837 – September 7, 1876) was the acting cashier at the First National Bank of Northfield, Minnesota, when the James-Younger Gang attempted to rob the bank. At the time, Heywood also held positions as Treasurer for the City of Northfield and Treasurer of Carleton College.

== Early life and career ==
Joseph Lee Heywood was born August 12, 1837, the sixth of seven children born to Benjamin Heywood and Sarah Cutler. He grew up on a farm near Fitzwilliam, New Hampshire, which he thought of as his hometown although his birthplace and that of his siblings was recorded as Royalston, Massachusetts, a city just a few miles away. Joseph's grandfather and great-grandfather were both soldiers in the American Revolutionary War.

One brother, John, was a farmer; two brothers, Silas and Charles, enlisted in the Union Army during the American Civil War.

Joseph left home at about 20 years of age, living a year each in Concord and Fitchburg, Massachusetts. He worked as a clerk in a drug store in New Baltimore, Michigan, for another year and then according to his military records, he moved to Davenport, Iowa. Joseph enlisted in the army on August 21, 1862, in Chicago and mustered into Captain Adoniram Judson Burroughs' Company (later designated Company B and known as the "Woodworth Rifles") of the 127th Illinois Infantry. He had just turned 25 years old, about the age of the average Union recruit.

He received about 2 1/2 months training at Camp Douglas in Chicago, which included some duty guarding Confederate prisoners who were being held to be exchanged for Union prisoners of war from the Battle of Harpers Ferry. The Union guards were treated as if they were prisoners themselves and suffered from many of the same privations as their Confederate prisoners: insufficient food and clothing, poor sanitation and victimization by violent gangs among them. They became restive and burned their quarters three or four times.

Before his regiment was sent to the front, 40% of Heywood's company had deserted and 14% had been discharged. Joseph remained with his unit, traveling first to Cairo, Illinois, by train and then by steamer to Memphis, Tennessee, where he was promoted to corporal. His initial duty chasing Generals Sterling Price and Earl Van Dorn did not result in any actual combat but he was soon drawn into the disastrous Battle of Chickasaw Bayou, led by General William Tecumseh Sherman, where he functioned as a skirmisher along the edge of the bayou and received intense fire from the Confederates on the bluff above the "Valley of Death" as well as some accidental friendly artillery fire.

The troop transport steamer that picked him up after the withdrawal from Chickasaw Bayou took Joseph directly to the very middle of the Battle of Arkansas Post. After making multiple assaults on the fort over open level ground, "The earth was literally blue from one end of their line to the other", according to one Confederate participant. The 127th Illinois was one of the first to plant their flag on the enemy fortifications.

While working in the disease-infested Desoto Peninsula on the Williams-Grant Canal project, the 127th Illinois was called upon to rescue Admiral Porter's gunboat fleet that had been ambushed by rebels in Deer Creek. Colonel Thomas Kilby Smith remarked about his men (which included Joseph Heywood), "The whistling of bullets is as familiar to their ears as household words. Danger they scorn, and the cheerfulness with which they encounter hardships is beyond all praise."

Heywood endured the long and arduous march down the west side of the Mississippi, across to Jackson and back to the east side of Vicksburg. He helped to destroy the enemy war-making capabilities in Jackson, and then moved on to the bloody battle of Champion Hill, serving temporarily under the command of General John McClernand. Although his unit was not in the most intense fighting, it did participate in the initial skirmishes along the Raymond Road and was involved in skirmishes with the retreating rebels.

Heywood and his comrades traversed some very treacherous terrain to advance to a position under one of the defender's parapets at Stockade Redan in the first of two bloody assaults on Vicksburg. They were receiving enfilading fire and taking heavy casualties while the Confederates were rushing reinforcements to that area as T. K. Smith's soldiers fixed bayonets and prepared to charge. Smith ordered them to withdraw when he realized it was impossible to scale the steep, high walls without special equipment. Later that night the rebels dropped grenades on the positions that had been occupied by the 127th Illinois Voluntary Infantry.

The next day, Colonel T. K. Smith's men moved along a ravine, encountering similar obstructions to those of the previous day, and advanced to the face of the enemy fortifications. However, their ranks were thinned by withering enfilading enemy fire and their advance was halted. Colonel Giles A. Smith, in his after action report, credited the 127th Illinois as being "first with the foremost."

Joseph became ill and was hospitalized, along with 400 other members of his regiment, at the division level hospital northwest of Vicksburg in Walnut Hills, overlooking the site of his initial exposure to combat at Chickasaw Bayou. The day before Vicksburg capitulated, Joseph was transported by hospital steamer to Adams Army Hospital in Memphis.

His initial diagnosis was diarrhea, one of the intestinal disorders that accounted for 50% of the disease deaths during the Civil War. In the middle of August, 1863 Joseph went on furlough and overstayed his leave by 17 days. When he was readmitted to the hospital steamer R. C. Wood, he was labeled a "deserter." He was subsequently admitted to the City U. S. Army General Hospital in Chicago on October 24, 1863, with a diagnosis of chronic diarrhea and was returned to duty ("refronted") on November 30, 1863. Colonel Deland, commander of Fort Douglas, labeled him a "straggler."

By December 4 he was back in Adams U. S. Army General Hospital in Memphis where he was called a "convalescent" with the notation that he had returned from "Desertion, furlough." After three months he was considered fit for duty, even though he still carried a diagnosis of chronic diarrhea, and was back aboard the R. C. Wood bound for Nashville. When he got there on March 19, 1864, he was admitted to Cumberland U. S. Army General Hospital with a diagnosis of chronic bronchitis. Twelve days later, he was apparently still not considered able to return to combat and was made an "Attendant at Large" within the hospital. After only a month and a half of being an attendant, Joseph was diagnosed with anasarca, a severe edema associated with kidney or liver failure that could be fatal.

Upon receiving the diagnosis of anasarca, Joseph was discharged from the army. Six months later, just before the Battle of Nashville, he again showed up at Cumberland U. S. Army General Hospital and was readmitted into the army. It is not clear what he did for the remainder of the war. Three letters from the Surgeon in Charge of Volunteers at the Cumberland Hospital, dated December 31, 1864, February 8, 1865, and March 31, 1865, were written on his behalf stating that he was a patient or was sick in hospital. It is hard to say whether or not he was actually so sick that he had to be hospitalized or the surgeon wanted to keep him as an attendant because he was good at his duties. According to the adjutant general's report for Company B of the 127th Illinois Heywood was mustered out as a corporal on May 27, 1865.

After his discharge in 1865 he spent a year with his brother in Illinois and then moved to Minnesota, living in Faribault and Minneapolis and finally arriving in Northfield in 1867. He married Martha Ann Buffum in 1869 and they had a daughter, Lizzie May born April 25, 1871. Martha died on May 3, 1872, and Joseph, following his wife's wish, subsequently married her best friend and his daughter's namesake, Lizzie Adams, to provide a good mother for their child.

Joseph worked as a bookkeeper for the Solomon P. Stuart Lumber Yard, near the railroad depot, from the time he arrived in Northfield until he accepted a position with the Bank of Northfield in 1872. (Stuart was mayor of Northfield at the time of the raid). Heywood continued with the First National Bank when it took over the assets of the earlier bank in 1873.

== Northfield Bank raid ==
On September 7, 1876, First National Bank of Northfield's President John C. Nutting and Cashier G. M. Phillips were at the Centennial Exposition in Philadelphia, Pennsylvania.

Around 2 p.m. on that day, three members of the James-Younger Gang entered the bank and discovered Heywood, bank teller Alonzo E. Bunker and bookkeeper Frank J. Wilcox. The bandits immediately pulled their guns and aimed them at the employees. One of the robbers asked Heywood if he was the cashier, to which Heywood said no (as he was technically the "acting cashier"). Bunker and Wilcox were also asked and both also denied being the cashier. A second outlaw ordered Heywood to open the safe, located in the vault. Heywood refused. When the second gang member began to go into the vault, Heywood threw himself against the vault door and attempted to lock the outlaw inside. The outlaw managed to get out of the vault, but his arm and hand were seriously bruised, though not broken. The third outlaw ran over to Heywood and knocked him to the floor with his pistol butt.

The first outlaw approached Heywood, who was lying dazed on the floor. He knelt in front of Heywood and took a pocket knife out of his pocket, then placed it against Heywood's neck and threatened to cut his throat. Although terrified, Heywood bravely replied that the outlaw would need to slit his throat, since he could not open the safe. In anger and frustration, the outlaw made a slight gash on Heywood's neck, then dragged him to his feet. Meanwhile, the third outlaw stuffed available bills into a grain sack. The first outlaw pointed his pistol at Heywood and again ordered him to open the safe. Heywood finally lied and told him that there was a chronometer (time lock) on the safe and it could not be opened. (There was a chronometer on the safe, but it had not been set and the safe itself was unlocked.)

Bunker then noticed that the second outlaw was guarding Wilcox and the third outlaw was busy collecting money. He made a dash out the back door. The third outlaw gave chase, following him out the door and shot Bunker in the shoulder.

Gang member Clell Miller, who was keeping watch on the street—which by this time was the site of a pitched gun battle between Northfield citizens and gang members—rode his horse back to the bank, dismounted, walked up to the door, and yelled inside to hurry up. Within minutes, two of the gang members on the streets had been killed and others were seriously wounded. Cole Younger rode his horse to the bank and screamed for the others to come out.

The first outlaw inside the bank once again knocked Heywood to the floor. Frustrated, he fired a bullet into the floor by Heywood's head. The third outlaw ran outside with the bag of money, followed by the first. The second outlaw left last and noticed Heywood trying to stand. The outlaw went back, placed his pistol to Heywood's head and fired, killing him, and then left the bank.

The three outlaws who entered the bank are believed to have been Frank James, Charlie Pitts, and Bob Younger.

The gang members managed to abscond with only US$26.70. The bank reportedly held over US$12,000 at the time of robbery.

== Aftermath ==
Heywood's body was taken back to his home on 517 3rd Street West (which is still standing) and was buried in the city cemetery. At his funeral on September 12, 1876, the Reverend Delavan Levant Leonard gave the following funeral discourse on Joseph Lee Heywood:

In God's good providence we are permitted to gaze upon the charming spectacle, alas, too seldom seen, and when seen, too seldom considered, of the walk and conversation of a good man. Here was one thoroughly Christian in all his instincts and ambitions and practices - one of the pure in heart, with vision for unseen things, and who walked by faith; who lived not for himself, but for others; who knew not how to be base, or dishonorable, or mean; knew not how to slight his work, or leave it half undone, or leave it for others to do; knew not how to prove false to his truth, or to flee from his post of duty; but who did know how to be faithful and true, utterly careless of the cost.

Mr. Heywood was beyond most men modest and timid. He did not even seem to know that he was lovable and well beloved, and was held in high esteem by all. He courted no praise, and sought no reward. Honors must come to him unsought if they were to come at all. He would be easily content to toil on, out of sight and with services unrecognized, but in every transaction must be conscientious through and through, and do each hour to the full duties of the hour.

Yes, something such a one as this walked our streets, entered our homes, worshiped in our assemblies, and bore his share of our public burdens. And so dull is human appreciation, that had he ended his days after the ordinary fashion of humanity, it is much to be feared his worth had never been widely known.

We shall reread the record he has made with sharpened vision. Besides, some of the virtues in which he excelled, such as integrity, moral courage, unflinching steadfastness in pursuing the right, in the tragic circumstances surrounding the close of his life, found not only their supreme test, but their sublime climax as well. The charm lies in the perfect harmony existing between the acts of the last hour and the conduct of all the years that went before.

There was no Federal Deposit Insurance Corporation covering bank funds at the time. When robbers stole from a bank, the money was lost forever. As the story of Heywood's bravery became public, banks all across Canada and the United States honored Heywood's heroic act protecting the funds of his community by making contributions to his widow and young daughter that amounted to over US $12,600.

His family eventually left Northfield, but Heywood's daughter later returned to attend Carleton College and graduated in 1893. She became a music teacher, married the Rev. Edwin Carlton Dean and died in December 1947.

== Memorials ==
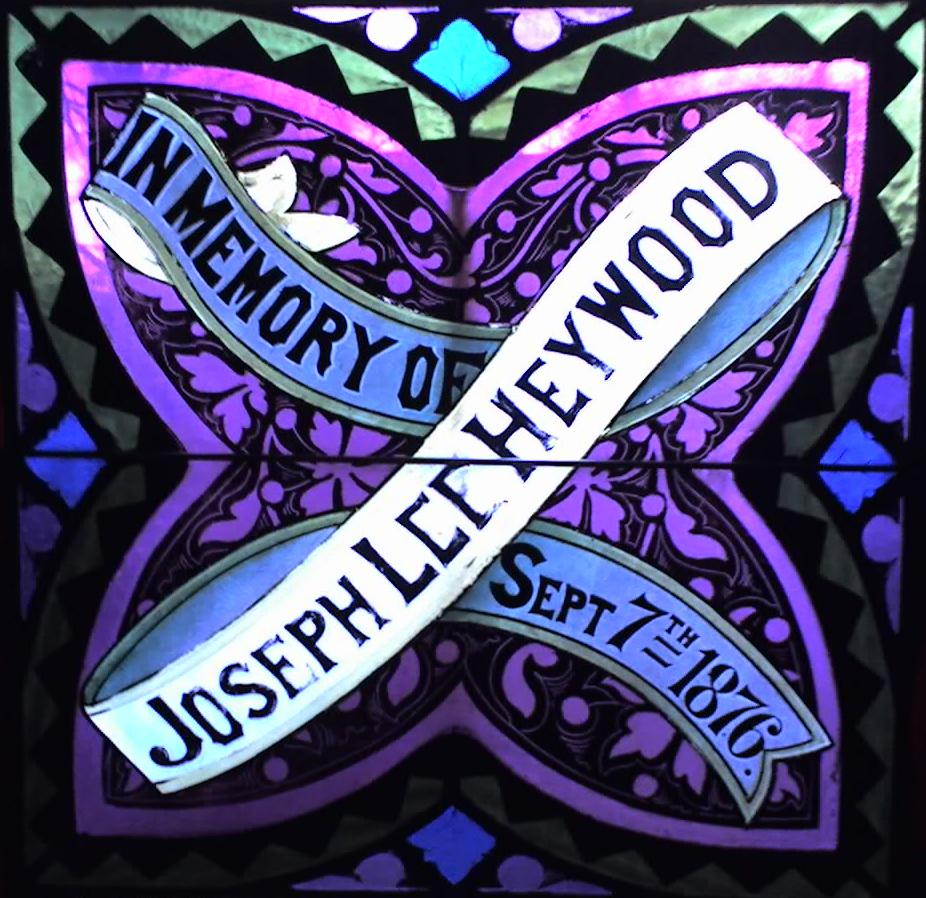
Memorial Window at First United Church of Christ in Northfield

Since that fateful day, Joseph Lee Heywood continues to be considered the hero of Northfield and is used as a supreme example to the community of a man faithful to duty. The Northfield Grand Army Post was named for him. The local United Church of Christ (Congregational) Church, of which he was a member, honored him with a memorial window.

After his death, Carleton College established a Heywood Library Fund and installed a memorial plaque on campus which reads:

A man modest, true, gentle; diligent in business; conscientious in duty; a citizen benevolent and honorable; towards God reverent and loyal; who, while defending his trust as a bank officer, fearlessly met death at the hands of armed robbers, in Northfield, Sept. 7, 1876. This tablet is inscribed by his friends as a tribute to heroic fidelity. ESTO FIDELIS USQUE AD MORTEM. (Faithful unto Death.)

In 1948, Northfield citizens founded the Defeat of Jesse James Days to honor the heroism of Northfield's townspeople. It has become one of the largest celebrations in Minnesota.

In 1983, The Joseph Lee Heywood Distinguished Service Award was created and is awarded annually to a Northfield citizen who exemplifies the commitment to public service for which Joseph Lee Heywood lived and died to "remind us of our past and our promise to improve our community for the future."

In 1995, Carleton College also created The Joseph Lee Heywood Society for those who make a commitment to Carleton's future through an estate provision or a life-income gift (such as a gift annuity or unitrust). The organization was begun as a way for the College to honor all alumni, parents, and friends whose gifts of future support ensure Carleton's continued excellence. The Heywood Society now includes over 1,200 members, spanning eight decades of Carleton alumni.

Heywood's life and death—as well as that of Swedish immigrant Nicholas Gustafson, who was also killed in the raid—is commemorated annually by a service of remembrance at the Northfield City Cemetery on September 7.
