= David Bly =

American politician (born 1952)

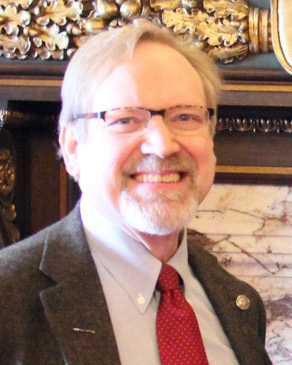

Member of the Minnesota House of Representatives from the 20B district 25B (2007–2011)
- In office January 8, 2013 – January 7, 2019
- Preceded by: redrawn district
- Succeeded by: Todd Lippert
- In office January 3, 2007 – January 3, 2011
- Preceded by: Raymond Cox
- Succeeded by: Kelby Woodard

Personal details
- Born: January 8, 1952 (age 74) Dubuque, Iowa
- Party: Minnesota Democratic–Farmer–Labor Party
- Spouse: Dominique
- Children: 2
- Education: Minneapolis Technical College; Oxford University; St. Olaf College; Minnesota State University, Mankato; St. Mary's University
- Occupation: educator

David Bly (born January 8, 1952, in Dubuque, Iowa) is an American politician and former member of the Minnesota House of Representatives. A member of the Minnesota Democratic–Farmer–Labor Party (DFL), he represented District 20B, which included portions of Le Sueur and Rice counties in the southeastern part of the state. He is also a retired teacher.

== Early career ==
Bly is a retired Language Arts and Special Education teacher, having taught in Milan, MN, Faribault Public Schools and at the Northfield Alternative Learning Center and is a longtime resident of Northfield.

He is the author of a booklet called "The Middle Class Amendment" (2008) which advocates for investment in the building blocks of a middle class economy. In 2016, he published "We All Do Better: Economic Priorities for a land of opportunity" available at Itaska books.

== Minnesota House of Representatives ==
Bly was first elected in 2006, and was re-elected in 2008. He was unseated by Kelby Woodard in the 2010 election, losing by 37 votes after a recount. He ran for the House again in a new, redrawn seat and was elected in 2012. He was re-elected again in 2014, winning by a margin of 16%.

During his first two terms, Bly was a member of the House Finance subcommittees for the Early Childhood Finance and Policy Division, the Energy Finance and Policy Division, the Higher Education and Workforce Development Finance and Policy Division, and the Housing Finance and Policy and Public Health Finance Division.

Bly's policy interests include creating a fair economy, environmental protection, expanding access to healthcare, and supporting individualized education and applied learning. He has received multiple endorsements from environmental advocacy groups.
