= Kelby Woodard =

American politician

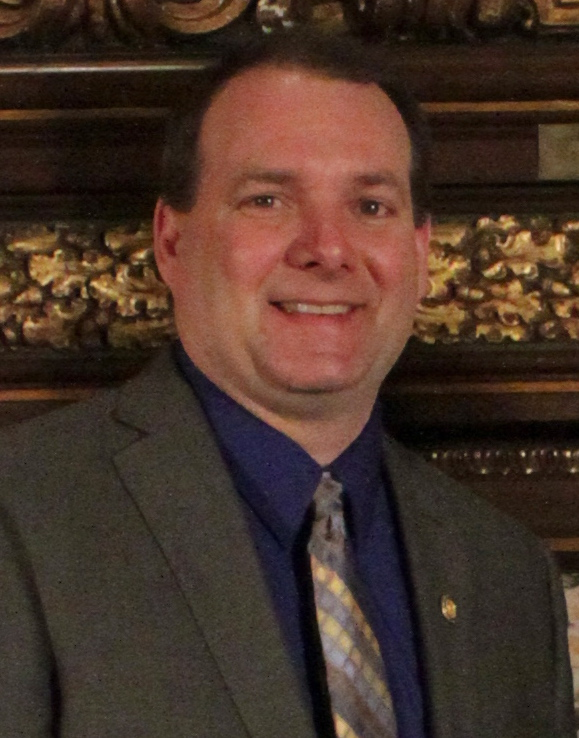

Member of the Minnesota House of Representatives from the 20A district 25B (2011–2013)
- In office January 4, 2011 – January 5, 2015
- Preceded by: David Bly
- Succeeded by: Bob Vogel

Personal details
- Born: April 1970 (age 56)
- Party: Republican Party of Minnesota
- Spouse: Donna
- Children: 5
- Education: University of Dallas; University of North Texas; Georgetown University
- Occupation: Small business owner, legislator

Kelby G. Woodard (born April 1970) is a Minnesota politician and former member of the Minnesota House of Representatives. A member of the Republican Party of Minnesota, he represented District 20A, which includes Le Sueur and Scott counties in the southeastern part of the state. He is also a small business owner of Trade Innovations, TRG Direct, and the Trusted Trade Alliance.

== Early life, education, and career ==
Woodard graduated from the University of North Texas in Denton, receiving his B.S. in Criminal Justice. He went on to earn a Certificate of Global Security Management from Georgetown University and a M.B.A. in International Business from the University of Dallas. He worked for the U.S. Customs Service, was the Director of Supply Chain Assets Protection for Target Corporation, and was also a member of the Minnesota Civil Air Patrol and the Scott County Criminal Justice Advisory Board.

== Minnesota House of Representatives ==
Woodard was first elected to the House in 2010, unseating incumbent David Bly by just 37 votes after a recount. He was re-elected in 2012.

He announced on April 14, 2014 that he would not seek re-election.

=== Same-sex marriage ===
On May 21, 2011, he joined the House Republican Majority in voting for a constitutional ban on same-sex marriage. On May 9, 2013, before the passage of a bill allowing same-sex civil marriages in Minnesota, Woodard pleaded with House members to reject the measure, citing a "deeply held belief" that marriage is between a man and a woman.

== Cristo Rey Dallas ==
Kelby served as the president of Cristo Rey Dallas College Prep, located in Dallas, Texas. The School is the 30th school in the Cristo Rey Network, which focuses on empowering students from underserved, low income communities to develop themselves as leaders and contributors of society. Kelby accepted the position of president in 2014, making him the founding president of the school.

== Saint Thomas Academy ==
On February 21, 2020, it was announced that beginning July 1, Woodard would become the headmaster of Saint Thomas Academy, returning to Minnesota after several years in Texas.
