= Belview, Minnesota =

City in Minnesota, United States

Belview
- City
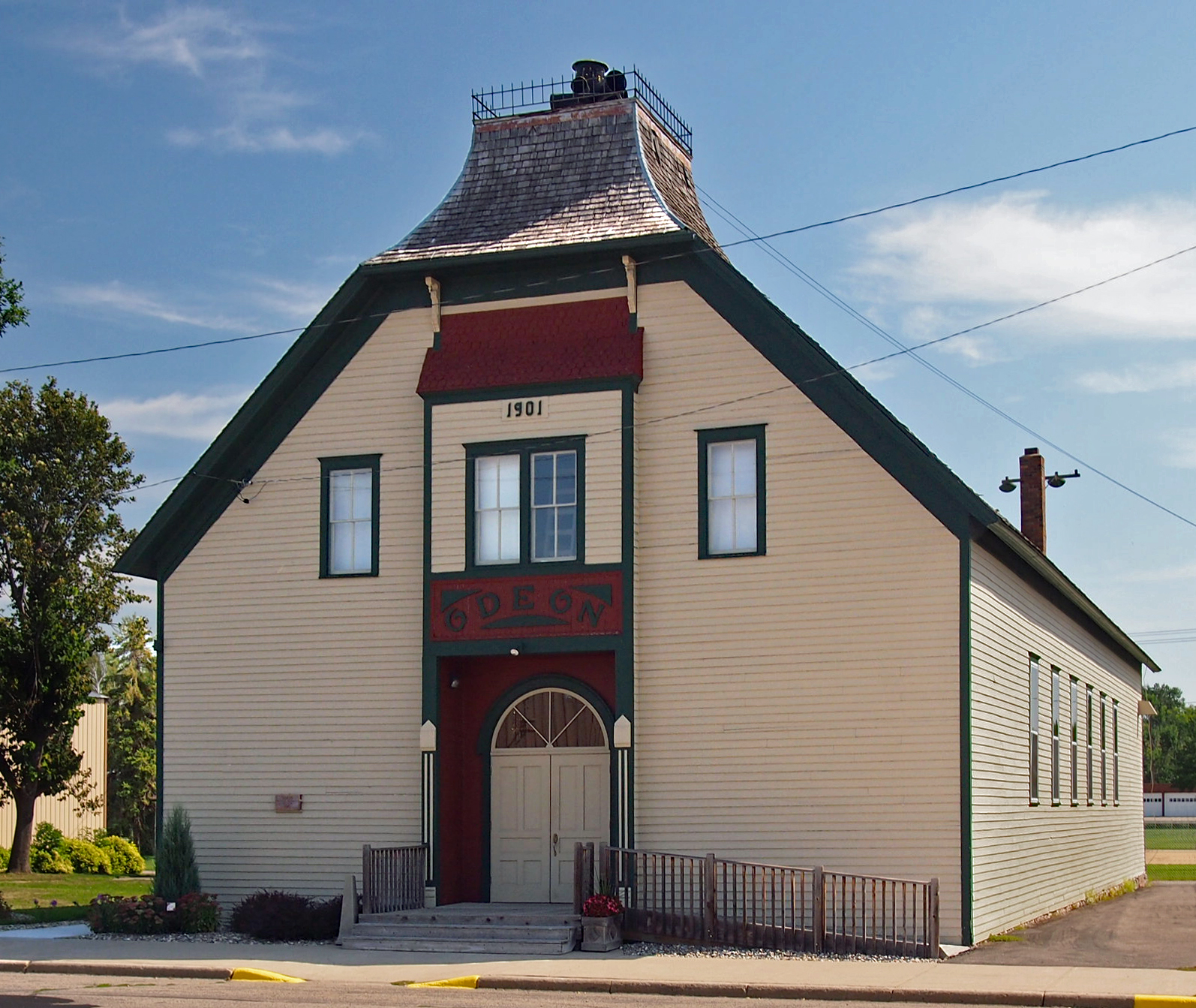
- Odeon Theater

- Cities and townships of Redwood County
- Coordinates: 44°36′15″N 95°19′42″W
- Country: United States
- State: Minnesota
- County: Redwood

Area
  - Total: 0.92 sq mi (2.37 km^{2})
  - Land: 0.92 sq mi (2.37 km^{2})
  - Water: 0 sq mi (0.00 km^{2})
- Elevation: 1,070 ft (326 m)

Population (2020)
  - Total: 291
  - Density: 317.6/sq mi (122.64/km^{2})
- Time zone: UTC-6 (Central (CST))
  - Summer (DST): UTC-5 (CDT)
- ZIP code: 56214
- Area code: 507
- FIPS code: 27-05050
- GNIS feature ID: 0639908
- Website: www.belviewmn.org

Belview is a city in Redwood County, Minnesota, United States. As of the 2020 census, Belview had a population of 291.

== History ==
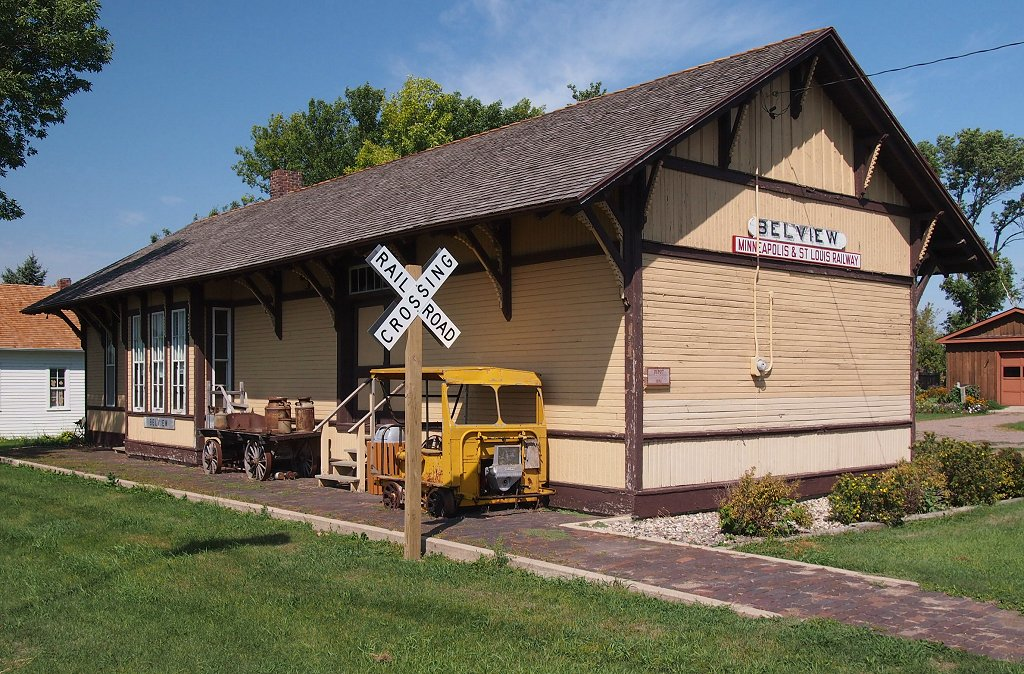
Minneapolis and St. Louis Railroad Depot

A post office called Belview has been in operation since 1887. Belview was platted in 1889. The name Belview is derived from the French language, meaning "beautiful view". Belview was incorporated in 1893.

== Geography ==
According to the United States Census Bureau, the city has a total area of 0.95 square miles (2.46 km^{2}), all land.

Belview lies at the intersection of County Roads 7 and 9:

- County Road 7 runs north–south, connecting Belview with Sacred Heart to the north and Seaforth to the south. Minnesota State Highways 19 and 67 lie a few miles south of Belview at an intersection with County Road 7.
- County Road 9 runs east–west, connecting Belview with Delhi to the east and Echo to the west.

== Demographics ==
Historical population
Census	Pop.	Note	%±
1900	254		—
1910	290		14.2%
1920	381		31.4%
1930	350		−8.1%
1940	409		16.9%
1950	381		−6.8%
1960	400		5.0%
1970	429		7.3%
1980	438		2.1%
1990	383		−12.6%
2000	412		7.6%
2010	384		−6.8%
2020	291		−24.2%
U.S. Decennial Census

=== 2010 census ===
As of the census of 2010, there were 384 people, 169 households, and 91 families living in the city. The population density was 404.2 inhabitants per square mile (156.1/km^{2}). There were 177 housing units at an average density of 186.3 per square mile (71.9/km^{2}). The racial makeup of the city was 98.2% White, 0.5% Asian, and 1.3% from two or more races. Hispanic or Latino of any race were 0.3% of the population.

There were 169 households, of which 24.3% had children under the age of 18 living with them, 42.0% were married couples living together, 7.1% had a female householder with no husband present, 4.7% had a male householder with no wife present, and 46.2% were non-families. 40.8% of all households were made up of individuals, and 30.2% had someone living alone who was 65 years of age or older. The average household size was 2.12 and the average family size was 2.87.

The median age in the city was 48.6 years. 18.2% of residents were under the age of 18; 8.1% were between the ages of 18 and 24; 18.2% were from 25 to 44; 24.5% were from 45 to 64; and 31% were 65 years of age or older. The gender makeup of the city was 45.1% male and 54.9% female.

=== 2000 census ===
As of the census of 2000, there were 412 people, 155 households and 93 families living in the city. The population density was 436.1 inhabitants per square mile (168.4/km^{2}). There were 170 housing units at an average density of 179.9 per square mile (69.5/km^{2}). The racial makeup of the city was 98.06% White, 1.70% Asian, and 0.24% from two or more races.

There were 155 households, of which 29.7% had children under the age of 18 living with them, 45.8% were married couples living together, 9.0% had a female householder with no husband present, and 40.0% were non-families. 38.1% of all households were made up of individuals, and 25.8% had someone living alone who was 65 years of age or older. The average household size was 2.33 and the average family size was 3.13.

In the city, the population was spread out, with 23.1% under the age of 18, 5.3% from 18 to 24, 22.6% from 25 to 44, 15.3% from 45 to 64, and 33.7% who were 65 years of age or older. The median age was 44 years. For every 100 females, there were 89.0 males. For every 100 females age 18 and over, there were 82.2 males.

The median income for a household in the city was $32,500, and the median income for a family was $42,857. Males had a median income of $27,188 versus $22,500 for females. The per capita income for the city was $16,105. None of the families and 3.1% of the population were living below the poverty line, including no under eighteens and 6.7% of those over 64.
