= Sheridan Township, Redwood County, Minnesota =

Sheridan Township, Minnesota
- Township
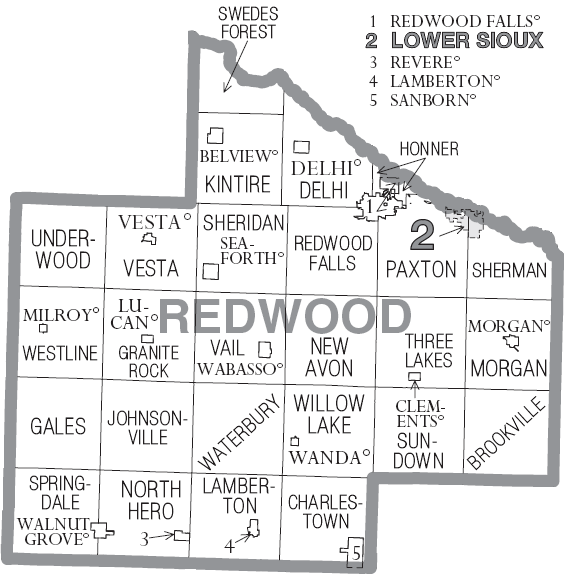
- Cities and townships of Redwood County
- Coordinates: 44°30′29″N 95°16′47″W
- Country: United States
- State: Minnesota
- County: Redwood

Area
  - Total: 34.0 sq mi (88.0 km^{2})
  - Land: 33.9 sq mi (87.9 km^{2})
  - Water: 0.039 sq mi (0.1 km^{2})
- Elevation: 1,050 ft (320 m)

Population (2000)
  - Total: 253
  - Density: 7.5/sq mi (2.9/km^{2})
- Time zone: UTC-6 (Central (CST))
  - Summer (DST): UTC-5 (CDT)
- FIPS code: 27-59656
- GNIS feature ID: 0665594

Sheridan Township is one of the twenty-six townships of Redwood County, Minnesota, United States. The population was 253 at the 2000 census.

Sheridan Township was organized in 1870, and named for Philip Sheridan (1831–1888), a U.S. Civil War general.

== Geography ==
According to the United States Census Bureau, the township has a total area of 34.0 square miles (88.0 km^{2}), of which 34.0 square miles (87.9 km^{2}) is land and 0.04 square mile (0.1 km^{2}) (0.09%) is water.

The city of Seaforth is located in Sheridan Township.

== Demographics ==
As of the census of 2000, there were 253 people, 85 households, and 68 families residing in the township. The population density was 7.5 people per square mile (2.9/km^{2}). There were 87 housing units at an average density of 2.6/sq mi (1.0/km^{2}). The racial makeup of the township was 98.81% White, 0.40% Asian, 0.40% from other races, and 0.40% from two or more races. Hispanic or Latino of any race were 2.37% of the population.

There were 85 households, out of which 40.0% had children under the age of 18 living with them, 67.1% were married couples living together, 5.9% had a female householder with no husband present, and 20.0% were non-families. 17.6% of all households were made up of individuals, and 8.2% had someone living alone who was 65 years of age or older. The average household size was 2.98 and the average family size was 3.40.

In the township the population was spread out, with 34.4% under the age of 18, 5.5% from 18 to 24, 23.3% from 25 to 44, 23.3% from 45 to 64, and 13.4% who were 65 years of age or older. The median age was 35 years. For every 100 females, there were 120.0 males. For every 100 females age 18 and over, there were 124.3 males.

The median income for a household in the township was $48,594, and the median income for a family was $49,688. Males had a median income of $37,500 versus $22,813 for females. The per capita income for the township was $19,099. About 8.1% of families and 9.3% of the population were below the poverty line, including 14.8% of those under the age of eighteen and 6.5% of those 65 or over.
