= Webster, Minnesota =

Webster
- Unincorporated community
- Location within Minnesota Location within the United States
- Coordinates: 44°31′47″N 93°21′10″W
- Country: United States
- State: Minnesota
- County: Rice County
- Township: Webster Township
- Elevation: 1,043 ft (318 m)
- Time zone: UTC-6 (Central (CST))
  - Summer (DST): UTC-5 (CDT)
- ZIP code: 55088
- Area code: 952
- GNIS feature ID: 653881

Webster is an unincorporated community in Webster Township, Rice County, Minnesota, United States.

The community is located at the junction of Rice County Roads 3 and 5. Porter Creek flows through the community.
