= Kintire Township, Redwood County, Minnesota =

Kintire Township, Minnesota
- Township
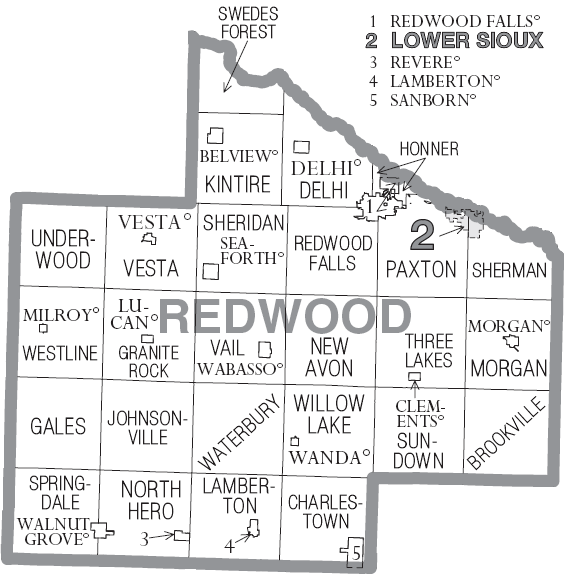
- Cities and townships of Redwood County
- Coordinates: 44°34′58″N 95°17′53″W
- Country: United States
- State: Minnesota
- County: Redwood

Area
  - Total: 35.3 sq mi (91.3 km^{2})
  - Land: 35.3 sq mi (91.3 km^{2})
  - Water: 0 sq mi (0.0 km^{2})
- Elevation: 1,050 ft (320 m)

Population (2000)
  - Total: 214
  - Density: 6.0/sq mi (2.3/km^{2})
- Time zone: UTC-6 (Central (CST))
  - Summer (DST): UTC-5 (CDT)
- FIPS code: 27-33434
- GNIS feature ID: 0664640

Kintire Township is one of the twenty-six townships of Redwood County, Minnesota, United States. The population was 214 at the 2000 census.

Kintire Township was organized in 1880, and named after Kintyre, in Scotland.

== Geography ==
According to the United States Census Bureau, the township has a total area of 35.3 square miles (91 km^{2}), all land.

The city of Belview is located in Kintire Township.

== Demographics ==
As of the census of 2000, there were 214 people, 78 households, and 62 families residing in the township. The population density was 6.1 inhabitants per square mile (2.4/km^{2}). There were 85 housing units at an average density of 2.4 per square mile (0.93/km^{2}). The racial makeup of the township was 99.07% White, 0.47% Asian, and 0.47% from two or more races.

There were 78 households, out of which 37.2% had children under the age of 18 living with them, 73.1% were married couples living together, 3.8% had a female householder with no husband present, and 20.5% were non-families. 19.2% of all households were made up of individuals, and 10.3% had someone living alone who was 65 years of age or older. The average household size was 2.74 and the average family size was 3.16.

In the township the population was spread out, with 29.4% under the age of 18, 6.5% from 18 to 24, 22.4% from 25 to 44, 23.8% from 45 to 64, and 17.8% who were 65 years of age or older. The median age was 40 years. For every 100 females, there were 125.3 males. For every 100 females age 18 and over, there were 118.8 males.

The median income for a household in the township was $38,375, and the median income for a family was $39,821. Males had a median income of $25,625 versus $19,688 for females. The per capita income for the township was $16,889. About 4.9% of families and 8.8% of the population were below the poverty line, including 10.2% of those under the age of eighteen and none of those 65 or over.
