= Forest Township, Rice County, Minnesota =

Forest Township, Minnesota
- Township
- Location within the state of Minnesota Forest Township, Minnesota (the United States)
- Coordinates: 44°25′N 93°20′W
- Country: United States
- State: Minnesota
- County: Rice

Area
  - Total: 35.7 sq mi (92.5 km^{2})
  - Land: 32.7 sq mi (84.7 km^{2})
  - Water: 3.0 sq mi (7.8 km^{2})
- Elevation: 1,050 ft (320 m)

Population (2000)
  - Total: 1,136
  - Density: 35/sq mi (13.4/km^{2})
- Time zone: UTC-6 (Central (CST))
  - Summer (DST): UTC-5 (CDT)
- FIPS code: 27-21680
- GNIS feature ID: 0664191
- Website: https://foresttownshipricecomn.gov/

Forest Township is a township in Rice County, Minnesota, United States. The population was 1,136 at the 2000 census. The unincorporated community of Millersburg is located within Forest Township.

== Geography ==
According to the United States Census Bureau, the township has a total area of 35.7 square miles (92 km^{2}), of which 32.7 square miles (85 km^{2}) is land and 3.0 square miles (7.8 km^{2}) (8.40%) is water.

Lakes in the township include Circle Lake and Fox Lake. Circle Lake covers 624 acres. Circle Lake provides a pair of public fishing docks on the west end of the lake, this is the arm that extends west from the northwest side of the "circle". The lake features northern pike, crappie and bluegill. Fox Lake covers 308 acres. The lake features walleye and white bass. Both lakes are good as a scenic, under-developed site which creates a calm, quiet place for fishing.

== Demographics ==
As of the census of 2000, there were 1,136 people, 400 households, and 323 families residing in the township. The population density was 34.7 inhabitants per square mile (13.4/km^{2}). There were 488 housing units at an average density of 14.9 per square mile (5.8/km^{2}). The racial makeup of the township was 98.24% White, 0.26% Native American, 0.35% Asian, 0.44% from other races, and 0.70% from two or more races. Hispanic or Latino of any race were 2.11% of the population.

There were 400 households, out of which 36.0% had children under the age of 18 living with them, 74.0% were married couples living together, 2.0% had a female householder with no husband present, and 19.3% were non-families. 14.3% of all households were made up of individuals, and 3.0% had someone living alone who was 65 years of age or older. The average household size was 2.84 and the average family size was 3.13.

In the township the population was spread out, with 27.2% under the age of 18, 5.9% from 18 to 24, 30.7% from 25 to 44, 27.9% from 45 to 64, and 8.3% who were 65 years of age or older. The median age was 38 years. For every 100 females, there were 116.8 males. For every 100 females age 18 and over, there were 115.4 males.

The median income for a household in the township was $62,443, and the median income for a family was $67,619. Males had a median income of $41,129 versus $29,844 for females. The per capita income for the township was $24,401. About 1.3% of families and 2.2% of the population were below the poverty line, including none of those under age 18 and 2.3% of those age 65 or over.

== History ==
Settled in the 1850s, Forest Township was probably named for the forests within its borders.

== Other sources ==
- Celebrating our Norwegian-Minnesota Heritage (Norwegian Statehood Pioneer Project. 2009)
- Fox Lake Norwegian Community, Its People, Its Church (Janice Uggen Johnson. DGI Publishing. 2007)
