= Wheatland Township, Rice County, Minnesota =

Wheatland Township, Minnesota
- Township
- Location within the state of Minnesota Wheatland Township, Minnesota (the United States)
- Coordinates: 44°29′17″N 93°27′29″W
- Country: United States
- State: Minnesota
- County: Rice

Area
  - Total: 34.7 sq mi (89.8 km^{2})
  - Land: 33.8 sq mi (87.5 km^{2})
  - Water: 0.89 sq mi (2.3 km^{2})
- Elevation: 1,070 ft (326 m)

Population (2000)
  - Total: 1,358
  - Density: 40/sq mi (15.5/km^{2})
- Time zone: UTC-6 (Central (CST))
  - Summer (DST): UTC-5 (CDT)
- FIPS code: 27-69826
- GNIS feature ID: 0665977

Wheatland Township is a township located in the northwest corner of Rice County, Minnesota, United States. The population was 1,358 at the 2000 census.

The unincorporated communities of Veseli and Wheatland are both located within Wheatland Township. The city of Lonsdale is located within the township geographically but is a separate entity.

== Geography ==
According to the United States Census Bureau, the township has a total area of 34.7 square miles (89.7 km^{2}), of which 33.8 square miles (87.5 km^{2}) is land and 0.9 square mile (2.3 km^{2}) (2.51%) is water.

== Communities ==
The city of Lonsdale is located at the southeast corner of the township but is a separate entity. Lonsdale was platted by the railroad when it was constructed in 1902. Originally, the railroad was supposed to go through the community of Veseli, named after a town in the Czech Republic, and spelled Wessely in the early years, but the route was changed at the last minute. Veseli did not have a paved road to the community until 1970, but has had an amateur baseball team, the Veseli Warriors, since the 1940s.

The township was originally populated by a small French Canadian group that was replaced by immigrants from southern Bohemia starting as early as 1860.

The community of Wheatland is located at the northeast corner of Cody Lake, along the southern border of Wheatland Township.

== Demographics ==
As of the census of 2000, there were 1,358 people, 437 households, and 370 families residing in the township. The population density was 40.2 inhabitants per square mile (15.5/km^{2}). There were 444 housing units at an average density of 13.1/sq mi (5.1/km^{2}). The racial makeup of the township was 99.04% White, 0.15% African American, 0.15% Native American, 0.22% Asian, and 0.44% from two or more races. Hispanic or Latino of any race were 0.59% of the population.

There were 437 households, out of which 48.5% had children under the age of 18 living with them, 74.4% were married couples living together, 5.5% had a female householder with no husband present, and 15.3% were non-families. 11.2% of all households were made up of individuals, and 4.6% had someone living alone who was 65 years of age or older. The average household size was 3.11 and the average family size was 3.36.

In the township the population was spread out, with 33.7% under the age of 18, 6.0% from 18 to 24, 31.6% from 25 to 44, 21.3% from 45 to 64, and 7.4% who were 65 years of age or older. The median age was 34 years. For every 100 females, there were 113.2 males. For every 100 females age 18 and over, there were 111.5 males.

The median income for a household in the township was $54,286, and the median income for a family was $60,074. Males had a median income of $39,861 versus $29,063 for females. The per capita income for the township was $20,402. About 2.5% of families and 3.6% of the population were below the poverty line, including 1.1% of those under age 18 and 12.7% of those age 65 or over.

== Notable person ==
- Louis Benedict Kucera, Roman Catholic bishop
