= Millersburg, Minnesota =

Millersburg
- Unincorporated community
- Location within Minnesota Location within the United States
- Coordinates: 44°25′40″N 93°19′55″W
- Country: United States
- State: Minnesota
- County: Rice County
- Township: Forest Township
- Elevation: 1,076 ft (328 m)
- Time zone: UTC-6 (Central (CST))
  - Summer (DST): UTC-5 (CDT)
- ZIP code: 55046
- Area code: 507
- GNIS feature ID: 654828

Millersburg is an unincorporated community in Forest Township, Rice County, Minnesota, United States.

The community is located along Rice County Road 1 (Millersburg Boulevard) near its junction with Chester Avenue. Nearby places include Lonsdale, Faribault, Northfield, and Dundas.

Millersburg was laid out in 1857 by George W. Miller, and named for him.
