= Webster Township, Rice County, Minnesota =

Webster Township, Minnesota
- Township
- Location within the state of Minnesota Webster Township, Minnesota (the United States)
- Coordinates: 44°30′35″N 93°20′14″W
- Country: United States
- State: Minnesota
- County: Rice

Area
  - Total: 35.7 sq mi (92.5 km^{2})
  - Land: 35.1 sq mi (91.0 km^{2})
  - Water: 0.58 sq mi (1.5 km^{2})
- Elevation: 1,145 ft (349 m)

Population (2000)
  - Total: 1,825
  - Density: 52/sq mi (20.1/km^{2})
- Time zone: UTC-6 (Central (CST))
  - Summer (DST): UTC-5 (CDT)
- ZIP code: 55088
- Area code: 952
- FIPS code: 27-68962
- GNIS feature ID: 0665945
- Website: https://www.webstertownship.com/

Webster Township is a township in Rice County, Minnesota, United States. The population was 1,825 at the 2000 census. The unincorporated communities of Hazelwood, Little Chicago, and Webster are in Webster Township.

== History ==
Webster Township was settled in the spring of 1855. It is named after Ferris Webster, who settled in the township a year later, and had a store in section 35. A post office was established in 1879, in section 8, and was later moved to section 10, in the same building as a store, with a creamery nearby.

== Geography ==
According to the United States Census Bureau, the township has an area of 35.7 square miles (92.5 km^{2}), of which 35.1 (91.0 km^{2}) is land and 0.6 (1.5 km^{2}, 1.60%) is water.

Interstate 35 and State Highway 19 (MN 19) are two of the township's main routes. Others include Rice County Roads 3, 5, 6, and 46.

== Demographics ==
As of the census of 2000, there were 1,825 people, 599 households, and 503 families residing in the township. The population density was 51.9 inhabitants per square mile (20.0/km^{2}). There were 615 housing units at an average density of 17.5/sq mi (6.8/km^{2}). The racial makeup of the township was 98.25% White, 0.05% African American, 0.77% Native American, 0.38% Asian, 0.16% from other races, and 0.38% from two or more races. Hispanic or Latino of any race were 0.66% of the population.

There were 599 households, out of which 41.6% had children under the age of 18 living with them, 78.1% were married couples living together, 3.0% had a female householder with no husband present, and 16.0% were non-families. 10.9% of all households were made up of individuals, and 2.3% had someone living alone who was 65 years of age or older. The average household size was 3.03 and the average family size was 3.29.

In the township the population was spread out, with 30.2% under the age of 18, 6.0% from 18 to 24, 30.5% from 25 to 44, 26.6% from 45 to 64, and 6.7% who were 65 years of age or older. The median age was 37 years. For every 100 females, there were 111.5 males. For every 100 females age 18 and over, there were 108.7 males.

The median income for a household in the township was $62,961, and the median income for a family was $66,912. Males had a median income of $42,367 versus $29,732 for females. The per capita income for the township was $23,040. About 2.1% of families and 3.3% of the population were below the poverty line, including 2.6% of those under age 18 and 5.8% of those age 65 or over.

== Baseball team ==
The Webster Sox represent Webster Township in the DRS Amateur Baseball League (DRS stands for Dakota, Scott, and Rice Counties). The DRS is a conference member of the Minnesota Amateur Baseball Association, which is divided into three classes (A, B, and C). The Sox Play at the Class C level. The team plays its home games at Webster Town Park at the Webster Coliseum. The team's players come from the Twin Cities and southern Minnesota.

== Webster FC Soccer Club ==
Webster FC is the first Soccer club In Webster Townships history. Opening in 2023 Webster FC Hosts Recreational soccer camps, clinics and Spring and Fall soccer training programs for U5 to U10 players of all abilities. Webster FC plays all its home games at the 35th Street soccer complex. Webster FC is affiliated with MN Youth Soccer and US Club Soccer Players come from all over the Twin Cities and southern Minnesota including Rice county and Scott county to take part in programs at Webster FC.
