= Seaforth, Minnesota =

City in Minnesota, United States

Seaforth
- City
- Cities and townships of Redwood County
- Coordinates: 44°28′37″N 95°19′43″W
- Country: United States
- State: Minnesota
- County: Redwood

Area
  - Total: 1.02 sq mi (2.65 km^{2})
  - Land: 1.02 sq mi (2.64 km^{2})
  - Water: 0.0077 sq mi (0.02 km^{2})
- Elevation: 1,053 ft (321 m)

Population (2020)
  - Total: 82
  - Density: 80.6/sq mi (31.12/km^{2})
- Time zone: UTC-6 (Central (CST))
  - Summer (DST): UTC-5 (CDT)
- ZIP code: 56287
- Area code: 507
- FIPS code: 27-59098
- GNIS feature ID: 2396564

Seaforth is a town in Redwood County, Minnesota, United States. As of the 2020 census, Seaforth had a population of 82.

== History ==
Seaforth was originally called Okawa, and under the latter name was platted in 1894. The present name is after Loch Seaforth, in Scotland. Seaforth was incorporated in 1900. A post office called Seaforth was established in 1899, and remained in operation until it was discontinued in 1995.

== Geography ==
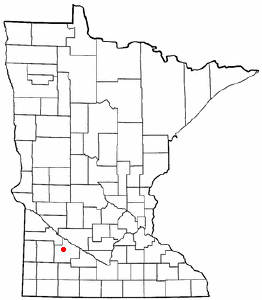
Location of Seaforth, Minnesota

According to the United States Census Bureau, the city has a total area of 1.01 square miles (2.62 km^{2}); 1.00 square mile (2.59 km^{2}) is land and 0.01 square miles (0.03 km^{2}) is water. The Redwood River flows through the northeastern corner of the city.

Seaforth is located along County Highway 7, which runs between Minnesota State Highways 19 and 67 to the north and 68 to the south.

== Demographics ==
Historical population
Census	Pop.	Note	%±
1910	158		—
1920	113		−28.5%
1930	124		9.7%
1940	148		19.4%
1950	136		−8.1%
1960	131		−3.7%
1970	132		0.8%
1980	90		−31.8%
1990	87		−3.3%
2000	77		−11.5%
2010	86		11.7%
2020	82		−4.7%
U.S. Decennial Census

=== 2010 census ===
As of the census of 2010, there were 86 people, 35 households, and 20 families living in the city. The population density was 86.0 inhabitants per square mile (33.2/km^{2}). There were 38 housing units at an average density of 38.0 per square mile (14.7/km^{2}). The racial makeup of the city was 100.0% White. Hispanic or Latino of any race were 2.3% of the population.

There were 35 households, of which 34.3% had children under the age of 18 living with them, 51.4% were married couples living together, 5.7% had a female householder with no husband present, and 42.9% were non-families. 37.1% of all households were made up of individuals, and 11.5% had someone living alone who was 65 years of age or older. The average household size was 2.46 and the average family size was 3.45.

The median age in the city was 36.5 years. 30.2% of residents were under the age of 18; 3.6% were between the ages of 18 and 24; 25.6% were from 25 to 44; 26.8% were from 45 to 64; and 14% were 65 years of age or older. The gender makeup of the city was 55.8% male and 44.2% female.

=== 2000 census ===
As of the census of 2000, there were 77 people, 37 households, and 20 families living in the city. The population density was 76.3 inhabitants per square mile (29.5/km^{2}). There were 41 housing units at an average density of 40.6 per square mile (15.7/km^{2}). The racial makeup of the city was 100.00% White.

There were 37 households, out of which 18.9% had children under the age of 18 living with them, 45.9% were married couples living together, 8.1% had a female householder with no husband present, and 45.9% were non-families. 40.5% of all households were made up of individuals, and 13.5% had someone living alone who was 65 years of age or older. The average household size was 2.08 and the average family size was 2.90.

In the city, the population was spread out, with 22.1% under the age of 18, 1.3% from 18 to 24, 24.7% from 25 to 44, 28.6% from 45 to 64, and 23.4% who were 65 years of age or older. The median age was 46 years. For every 100 females, there were 92.5 males. For every 100 females age 18 and over, there were 87.5 males.

The median income for a household in the city was $27,143, and the median income for a family was $26,875. Males had a median income of $29,375 versus $22,500 for females. The per capita income for the city was $15,089. There were 9.5% of families and 9.4% of the population living below the poverty line, including 66.7% of under eighteens and none of those over 64.
