= Echo, Minnesota =

City in Minnesota, United States

Echo
- City
- Location of Echo, Minnesota
- Coordinates: 44°37′04″N 95°24′50″W
- Country: United States
- State: Minnesota
- County: Yellow Medicine
- Founded: 1884
- Incorporated: 1892

Area
  - Total: 0.37 sq mi (0.95 km^{2})
  - Land: 0.37 sq mi (0.95 km^{2})
  - Water: 0 sq mi (0.00 km^{2})
- Elevation: 1,079 ft (329 m)

Population (2020)
  - Total: 243
  - Estimate (2021): 235
  - Density: 663.7/sq mi (256.27/km^{2})
- Time zone: UTC-6 (Central)
  - Summer (DST): UTC-5 (CDT)
- ZIP code: 56237
- Area code: 507
- FIPS code: 27-17900
- GNIS feature ID: 2394612
- Website: echomn.com

Echo is a city in Yellow Medicine County, Minnesota, United States. The population was 243 at the 2020 census.

== History ==
Echo was platted in 1884, and named for its location in Echo Township. Echo was incorporated in 1892.

== Geography ==
According to the United States Census Bureau, the city has a total area of 1.01 square miles (2.62 km^{2}), all land.

== Demographics ==
Historical population
Census	Pop.	Note	%±
1900	334		—
1910	430		28.7%
1920	482		12.1%
1930	403		−16.4%
1940	477		18.4%
1950	490		2.7%
1960	459		−6.3%
1970	356		−22.4%
1980	334		−6.2%
1990	304		−9.0%
2000	278		−8.6%
2010	278		0.0%
2020	243		−12.6%
2021 (est.)	235		−3.3%
U.S. Decennial Census; 2020 Census

=== 2010 census ===
As of the census of 2010, there were 278 people, 111 households, and 71 families living in the city. The population density was 275.2 inhabitants per square mile (106.3/km^{2}). There were 122 housing units at an average density of 120.8 per square mile (46.6/km^{2}). The racial makeup of the city was 91.7% White, 1.4% Native American, 1.4% Asian, 1.8% from other races, and 3.6% from two or more races. Hispanic or Latino of any race were 5.8% of the population.

There were 111 households, of which 34.2% had children under the age of 18 living with them, 45.9% were married couples living together, 12.6% had a female householder with no husband present, 5.4% had a male householder with no wife present, and 36.0% were non-families. 33.3% of all households were made up of individuals, and 15.3% had someone living alone who was 65 years of age or older. The average household size was 2.50 and the average family size was 3.23.

The median age in the city was 37 years. 32% of residents were under the age of 18; 6.1% were between the ages of 18 and 24; 23.1% were from 25 to 44; 23.4% were from 45 to 64; and 15.5% were 65 years of age or older. The gender makeup of the city was 50.0% male and 50.0% female.

=== 2000 census ===
As of the census of 2000, there were 278 people, 119 households, and 69 families living in the city. The population density was 273.1 inhabitants per square mile (105.4/km^{2}). There were 136 housing units at an average density of 133.6 per square mile (51.6/km^{2}). The racial makeup of the city was 97.48% White, 1.08% Native American, and 1.44% from two or more races. Hispanic or Latino of any race were 1.08% of the population.

There were 119 households, out of which 28.6% had children under the age of 18 living with them, 49.6% were married couples living together, 4.2% had a female householder with no husband present, and 41.2% were non-families. 37.8% of all households were made up of individuals, and 26.1% had someone living alone who was 65 years of age or older. The average household size was 2.34 and the average family size was 3.16.

In the city, the population was spread out, with 27.0% under the age of 18, 6.5% from 18 to 24, 24.1% from 25 to 44, 19.8% from 45 to 64, and 22.7% who were 65 years of age or older. The median age was 40 years. For every 100 females, there were 91.7 males. For every 100 females age 18 and over, there were 95.2 males.

The median income for a household in the city was $27,656, and the median income for a family was $35,500. Males had a median income of $25,714 versus $20,385 for females. The per capita income for the city was $15,275. About 6.3% of families and 10.6% of the population were below the poverty line, including 13.2% of those under the age of eighteen and 5.6% of those 65 or over.
