= Lonsdale, Minnesota =

City in Minnesota, United States

- City
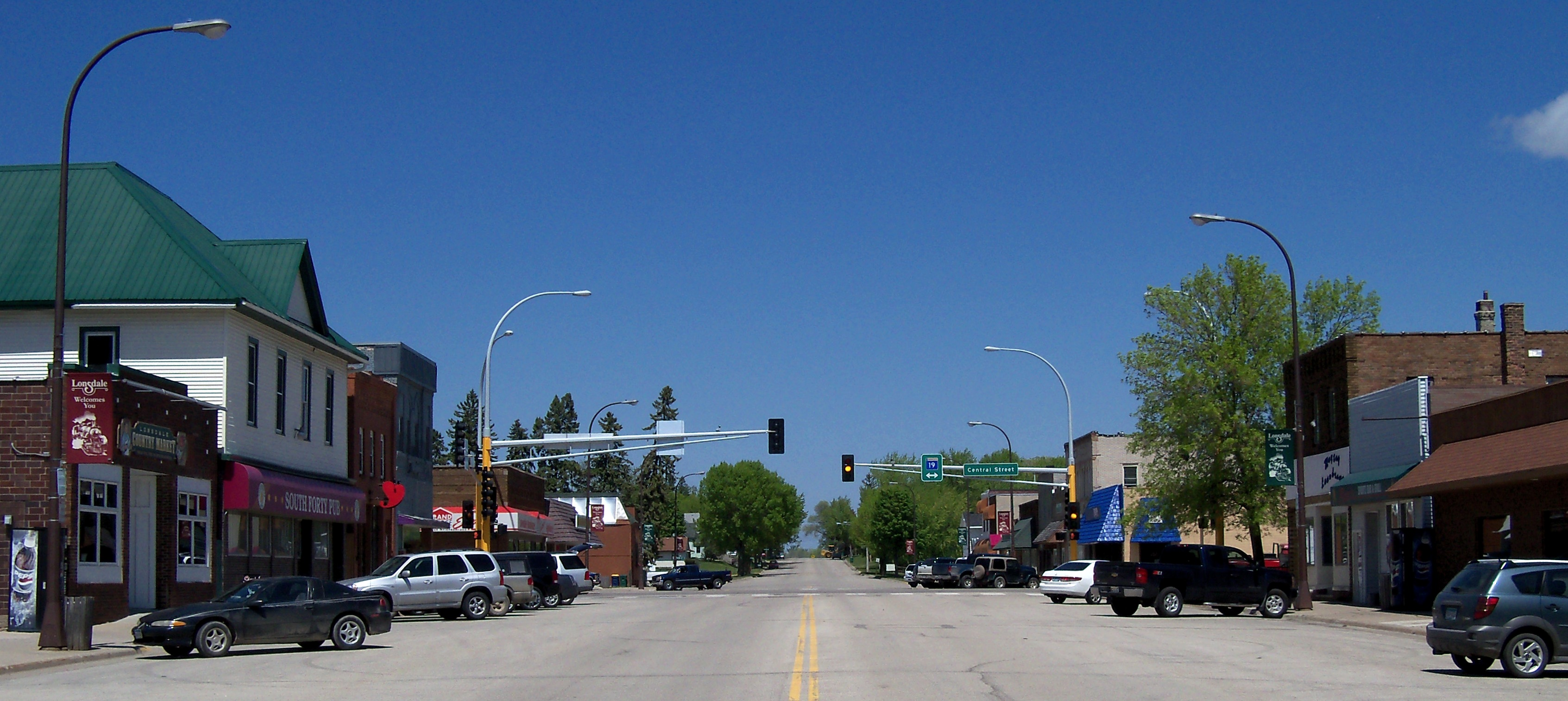
- Downtown Lonsdale
- Motto: Preserving Our Heritage To Better Our Future
- Location in the state of Minnesota, USA
- Coordinates: 44°28′40″N 93°25′21″W
- Country: United States
- State: Minnesota
- County: Rice
- Incorporated: 1903

Area
  - Total: 2.66 sq mi (6.88 km^{2})
  - Land: 2.63 sq mi (6.81 km^{2})
  - Water: 0.023 sq mi (0.06 km^{2})
- Elevation: 1,135 ft (346 m)

Population (2020)
  - Total: 4,686
  - Density: 1,781/sq mi (687.7/km^{2})
- Time zone: UTC-4 (CST)
  - Summer (DST): UTC-5 (CST)
- ZIP code: 55046
- Area code: 507
- FIPS code: 27-38150
- GNIS feature ID: 2395762
- Website: https://lonsdalemn.com/

Lonsdale is a city in Rice County, Minnesota, United States. The population was 4,686 at the 2020 census, with a 2026 estimate of 5,243. A fast growing exurb of the Minneapolis-Saint Paul metropolitan area, Lonsdale is located 40 miles south of downtown Minneapolis.

== History ==
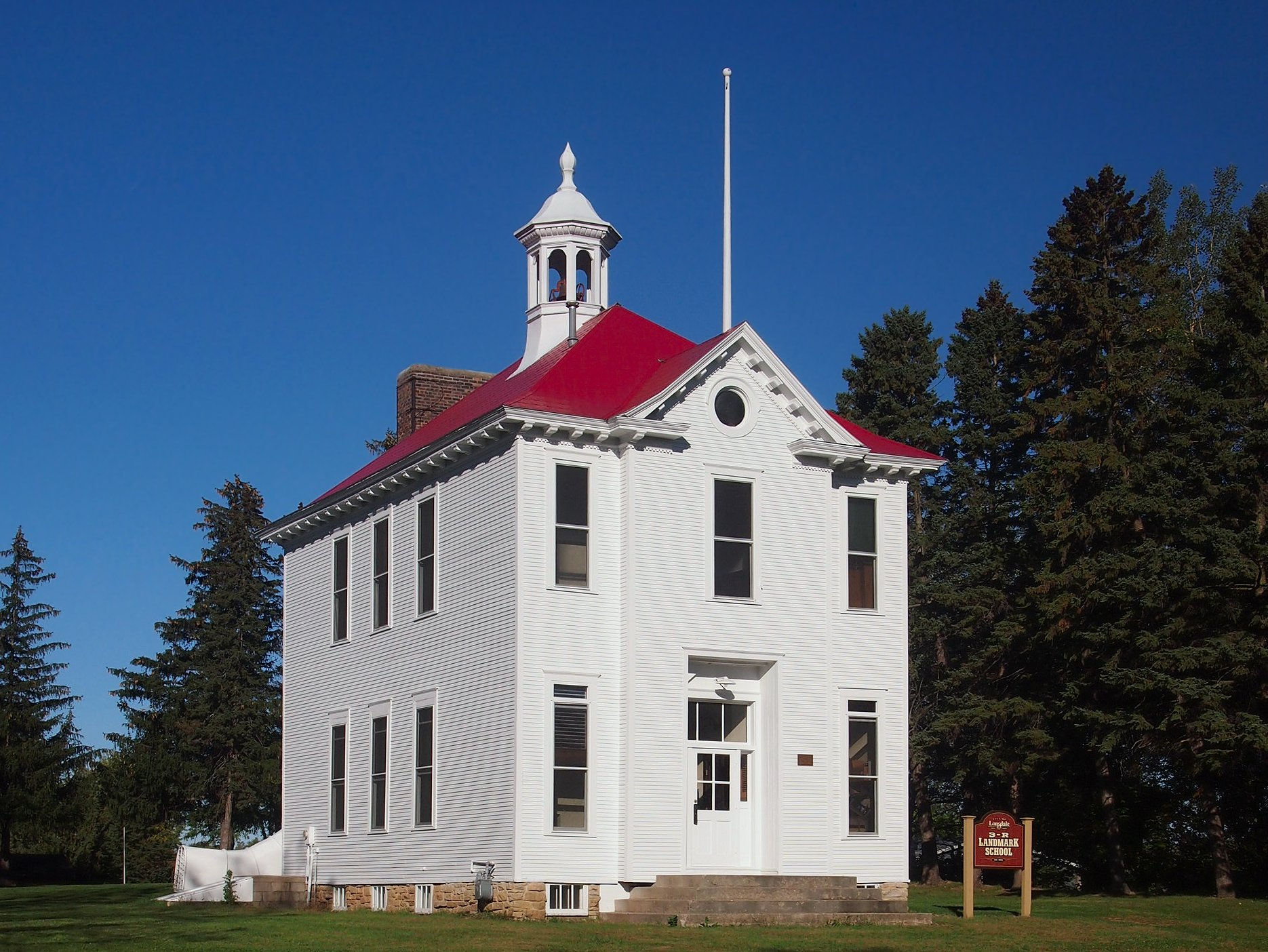
3-R Landmark School Museum, former District #76 School

Prior to the American Civil War, a number of families of Czech descent had begun migrating to south central Minnesota from Bohemia. In 1878, a small settlement of Norwegian farmers built a Lutheran church slightly to the southeast of present day Lonsdale. They called the area Trondhjem, after the name of the city in Norway from which they had emigrated. In 1891, a proposed new railroad from Mankato to Farmington was reported in the New Prague Times. However, construction of this railroad was never initiated due to an economic downturn.

It was the Chicago, Milwaukee and St. Paul Railway that proceeded with plans for their existing branch line from Wells to Mankato, to begin constructing trackage northeastward into Farmington. The extension of this line would bring the possibility of development, population growth and job opportunities to towns along the prospective line such as Cleveland, Le Sueur Center, Veseli and New Market. But the businesses of the Veseli area favored the construction of a spur line of the Minneapolis & St. Louis Railway (M & St. L) from New Prague instead.

In July and August 1901, the Chicago, Milwaukee, and St. Paul Railway created their right-of-way with the purchase of a 100 foot wide strip of land that ran through the Trondhjem settlement and was therefore also a few miles south of Veseli. At the end of 1901, landowner Thomas Wilby entered into an agreement with the Milwaukee Land Company to develop 40 acres of his property. But the contract stipulated that he must first convey land to the Chicago, Milwaukee, and St. Paul Railway that was necessary to build a train depot. The Milwaukee Land Company would then survey and plot the remaining acres of Wilby's land in order to establish a village. By January 1902, a total of 80 acres had been plotted as a new town site. On July 16, 1902 a grand opening of the town of Lonsdale was held as lots were auctioned for sale. Businessman Martin Benzik purchased several of these lots, and constructed the first buildings in Lonsdale: a saloon, a hotel and a livery stable.

The railroad tracks were laid in town on August 1, 1902, and a 20,000 bushel grain elevator was opened on the other side of the railroad tracks from the depot. To be closer to the railway, some former residents of Veseli placed their homes on skids and pulled them to Lonsdale, using steam tractors. In May 1903, Martin Benzik and other businessmen petitioned for incorporation of the land, known as the Village of Lonsdale. A public election was set for July 1, 1903, and with a vote of 24-0 in favor of incorporation, the city of Lonsdale was born. The initial population of the city was 84 people.

The building of the Catholic Church of the Immaculate Conception was completed by the fall of 1904, a rectory was built alongside the church in 1907, and the Catholic school was built in 1912. Also in 1907, the city water tank was built, and the public school house was constructed in 1908. Calvary Hill Cemetery was established south of Lonsdale in 1910. Several theories exist as to how Lonsdale got its name, but it remains a mystery. One theory is that the town was named after the surveyor from the railroad. Another possibility is that it was named for another place named Lonsdale, either in the United States or England.

== Geography ==
According to the United States Census Bureau, the city has a total area of 2.77 square miles (7.17 km^{2}); 2.73 square miles (7.07 km^{2}) is land and 0.04 square miles (0.10 km^{2}) is water.

Minnesota State Highway 19 serves as a main route in the city.

== Demographics ==
Historical population
Census	Pop.	Note	%±
1910	271		—
1920	459		69.4%
1930	508		10.7%
1940	545		7.3%
1950	510		−6.4%
1960	541		6.1%
1970	622		15.0%
1980	1,160		86.5%
1990	1,252		7.9%
2000	1,491		19.1%
2010	3,674		146.4%
2020	4,686		27.5%
2026 (est.)	5,243		11.9%
U.S. Decennial Census

=== 2020 census ===
As of the 2020 census, Lonsdale had a population of 4,686. The median age was 32.1 years. 32.8% of residents were under the age of 18 and 8.6% of residents were 65 years of age or older. For every 100 females there were 102.7 males, and for every 100 females age 18 and over there were 99.1 males age 18 and over.

0.0% of residents lived in urban areas, while 100.0% lived in rural areas.

There were 1,551 households in Lonsdale, of which 49.1% had children under the age of 18 living in them. Of all households, 62.5% were married-couple households, 13.5% were households with a male householder and no spouse or partner present, and 14.7% were households with a female householder and no spouse or partner present. About 16.3% of all households were made up of individuals and 6.8% had someone living alone who was 65 years of age or older.

There were 1,606 housing units, of which 3.4% were vacant. The homeowner vacancy rate was 0.9% and the rental vacancy rate was 9.2%.

Racial composition as of the 2020 census
Race	Number	Percent
White	4,186	89.3%
Black or African American	63	1.3%
American Indian and Alaska Native	12	0.3%
Asian	61	1.3%
Native Hawaiian and Other Pacific Islander	3	0.1%
Some other race	70	1.5%
Two or more races	291	6.2%
Hispanic or Latino (of any race)	189	4.0%

=== 2010 census ===
As of the census of 2010, there were 3,674 people, 1,277 households, and 976 families living in the city. The population density was 1,345.8 inhabitants per square mile (519.6/km^{2}). There were 1,370 housing units at an average density of 501.8 per square mile (193.7/km^{2}). The racial makeup of the city was 96.5% White, 0.4% African American, 0.3% Native American, 0.8% Asian, 0.3% Pacific Islander, 0.3% from other races, and 1.4% from two or more races. Hispanic or Latino of any race were 1.7% of the population.

There were 1,277 households, of which 49.4% had children under the age of 18 living with them, 64.4% were married couples living together, 6.7% had a female householder with no husband present, 5.3% had a male householder with no wife present, and 23.6% were non-families. 16.6% of all households were made up of individuals, and 4.6% had someone living alone who was 65 years of age or older. The average household size was 2.87 and the average family size was 3.27.

The median age in the city was 29.5 years. 34.2% of residents were under the age of 18; 5.8% were between the ages of 18 and 24; 39.2% were from 25 to 44; 15.9% were from 45 to 64; and 4.9% were 65 years of age or older. The gender makeup of the city was 51.1% male and 48.9% female.

=== 2000 census ===
As of the census of 2000, there were 1,491 people, 560 households, and 394 families living in the city. The population density was 1,127.3 inhabitants per square mile (435.3/km^{2}). There were 577 housing units at an average density of 436.2 per square mile (168.4/km^{2}). The racial makeup of the city was 98.66% White, 0.20% African American, 0.40% Native American, 0.13% Asian, and 0.60% from two or more races. Hispanic or Latino of any race were 0.34% of the population.

There were 560 households, out of which 39.3% had children under the age of 18 living with them, 58.9% were married couples living together, 6.8% had a female householder with no husband present, and 29.5% were non-families. 23.9% of all households were made up of individuals, and 9.6% had someone living alone who was 65 years of age or older. The average household size was 2.62 and the average family size was 3.12.

In the city, the population was spread out, with 28.4% under the age of 18, 9.5% from 18 to 24, 33.3% from 25 to 44, 16.6% from 45 to 64, and 12.3% who were 65 years of age or older. The median age was 32 years. For every 100 females, there were 99.6 males. For every 100 females age 18 and over, there were 95.6 males.

The median income for a household in the city was $50,054, and the median income for a family was $58,676. Males had a median income of $37,800 versus $25,607 for females. The per capita income for the city was $20,368. About 4.6% of families and 6.1% of the population were below the poverty line, including 4.1% of those under age 18 and 18.8% of those age 65 or over.

== Education ==
Residents of the Lonsdale area are served by two public school districts and two Catholic schools. They include:

=== Tri-City United Public Schools - ISD # 2905 ===
- Tri-City United High School (Montgomery, Minnesota)
- Montgomery Middle School
- Lonsdale Elementary

=== New Prague Public Schools - ISD # 721 ===
- New Prague High School
- New Prague Middle School
- Falcon Ridge Elementary School
- Eagle View Elementary School (Elko New Market, Minnesota)

=== Archdiocese of Saint Paul and Minneapolis ===
- Holy Cross Catholic School (Webster, Minnesota)
- Most Holy Redeemer Catholic School (Montgomery, Minnesota)

== Parks and recreation ==
=== City parks ===
- 8th Avenue Park
- Bastyr Park
- Jaycee Park
- Kalina Park
- Singing Hills Park
- Sticha Park
- Trenda Memorial Park

=== Recreation ===
- Archery Range
- Dog Park
- Main Street Plaza
- Nature Center
- Rezac Nature Preserve
- Trail System
