= 2020 United States presidential election in Minnesota =

- November 3, 2020
- Turnout: 79.96% (▲5.24 pp)

Nominee	Joe Biden	Donald Trump
Party	Democratic (DFL)	Republican
Home state	Delaware	Florida
Running mate	Kamala Harris	Mike Pence
Electoral vote	10	0
Popular vote	1,717,077	1,484,065
Percentage	52.40%	45.28%

Biden
40–50%
50–60%
60–70%
70–80%
80–90%
90–100%
Trump
40–50%
50–60%
60–70%
70–80%
80–90%
90–100%
Tie/No Data
President before election
Donald Trump
Republican
Elected President
Joe Biden
Democratic (DFL)

The 2020 United States presidential election in Minnesota was held on Tuesday, November 3, 2020, as part of the 2020 United States presidential election in which all 50 states plus the District of Columbia participated. Minnesota voters chose electors to represent them in the Electoral College via a popular vote, pitting the Republican Party's nominee, incumbent President Donald Trump, and running mate Vice President Mike Pence against the DFL nominee, former Vice President Joe Biden, and his running mate California Senator Kamala Harris. Minnesota has ten electoral votes in the Electoral College.

Prior to the election, 15 out of 16 news organizations predicting the election projected Minnesota as leaning towards Biden. Biden ultimately carried the state by a 7.12% margin, significantly improving over Hillary Clinton's narrow 1.52% margin in 2016. Biden's win marked the twelfth consecutive Democratic presidential win in the state, which has not voted for a Republican for president since 1972.

Biden flipped four counties Trump carried in 2016: Clay, Nicollet, Blue Earth, and Winona, all of which were won by Barack Obama in 2008 and 2012. The key to Biden's success was his strong performance in the Twin Cities metropolitan area, where he outperformed FDR, LBJ, Obama and Clinton. His vote share in Hennepin County, home of Minneapolis, was the highest of any presidential nominee since Republican Theodore Roosevelt in 1904. He also improved on Clinton's performance in the Iron Range, although his performance in the region was still well below what Democrats had historically earned between the New Deal realignment and the 2016 election. In addition, Biden managed to flip Minnesota's 2nd congressional district, based in the Twin Cities' southern suburbs and exurbs, from Trump.

Per exit polls by the Associated Press, Biden carried 51% of White Minnesotans, as well as 58% of college educated voters and 55% of voters from union households. Trump's strength was concentrated in rural areas, while Biden performed better in urban and suburban areas.

Biden became the first Democrat to win the White House without carrying Koochiching or Mahnomen Counties since those counties were formed in 1906; the first Democrat to win without Traverse County since Grover Cleveland in 1892; the first to win without Kittson, Norman, Itasca, or Beltrami Counties since Woodrow Wilson in 1912; the first to win without Swift County since Wilson in 1916; the first to win without Lac qui Parle County since Franklin D. Roosevelt in 1944; the first to win without Chippewa, Freeborn, Mower, or Rice Counties since John F. Kennedy in 1960 and the first to win without Fillmore County since Jimmy Carter in 1976. This is the first time since 1964 in which Minnesota voted more Republican than New Hampshire.

== Primary elections ==
=== Republican primary ===
The Republican primary took place on March 3, 2020. Donald Trump and Bill Weld were among the declared Republican candidates.

2020 Minnesota Republican presidential primary
Candidate	Votes	%	Delegates
Donald Trump (incumbent)	137,275	97.7	39
Bill Weld (write-in)	443	0.3	0
Rocky De La Fuente (write-in)	16	0.0	0
Other write-ins	2,821	2.0	0
Total	140,555	100.0	39 (of 39)

=== Democratic primary ===
The Democratic primary took place on March 3, 2020. Elizabeth Warren, Bernie Sanders, and former Vice President Joe Biden were among the major declared candidates. Amy Klobuchar, U.S. Senator from Minnesota since 2007, expressed interest in running, and formally declared her candidacy in February 2019, but then withdrew prior to Minnesota's race.

Biden won the most delegates.

Popular vote share by county
Biden—30–40%
Biden—40–50%
Biden—50–60%
Biden—60–70%
Sanders—<30%
Sanders—30–40%
Klobuchar—<30%
Klobuchar—30–40%
Klobuchar—40–50%

Popular vote share by congressional district
Biden—30–40%
Biden—40–50%
Sanders—30–40%

2020 Minnesota Democratic presidential primary
Candidate	Votes	%	Delegates
Joe Biden	287,553	38.64	38
Bernie Sanders	222,431	29.89	27
Elizabeth Warren	114,674	15.41	10
Michael Bloomberg	61,882	8.32	
Amy Klobuchar (withdrawn) (Note: Candidate withdrew shortly before the primary when absentee voting had already begun.)	41,530	5.58	
Pete Buttigieg (withdrawn)	7,616	1.02	
Tulsi Gabbard	2,504	0.34	
Andrew Yang (withdrawn) (Note: Candidate withdrew after the New Hampshire primary when absentee voting had already begun.)	1,749	0.24	
Tom Steyer (withdrawn)	551	0.07	
Michael Bennet (withdrawn)	315	0.04	
Marianne Williamson (withdrawn)	226	0.03	
Cory Booker (withdrawn)	197	0.03	
John Delaney (withdrawn) (Note: Candidate withdrew during the first days of absentee voting.)	172	0.02	
Julian Castro (withdrawn)	114	0.02	
Deval Patrick (withdrawn) (Note: Candidate withdrew after in-person absentee voting started on January 17, 2020.)	72	0.01	
Uncommitted	2,612	0.35	
Total	744,198	100%	75

=== Libertarian caucuses ===
2020 Minnesota Libertarian presidential caucuses
- February 25, 2020
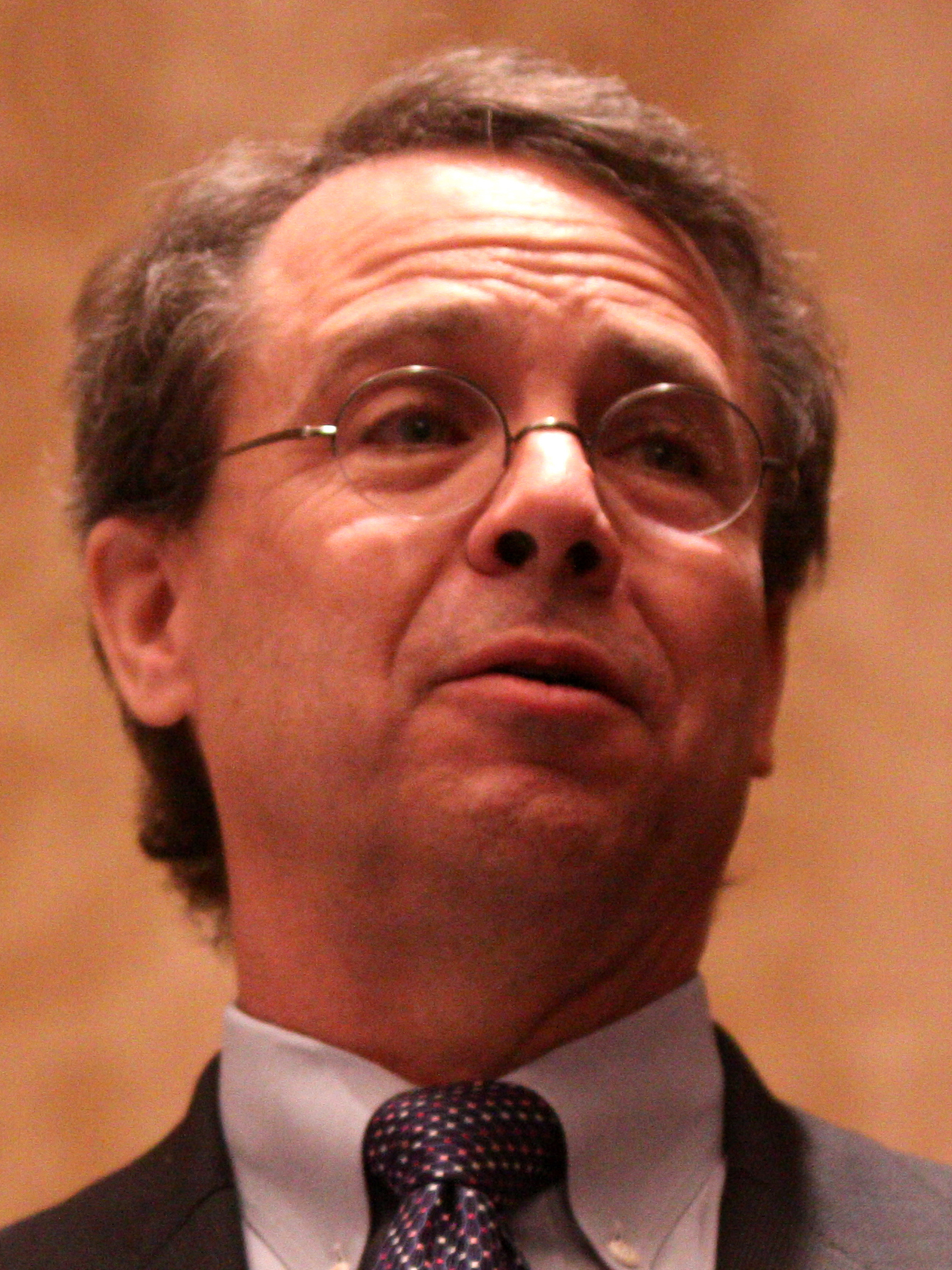

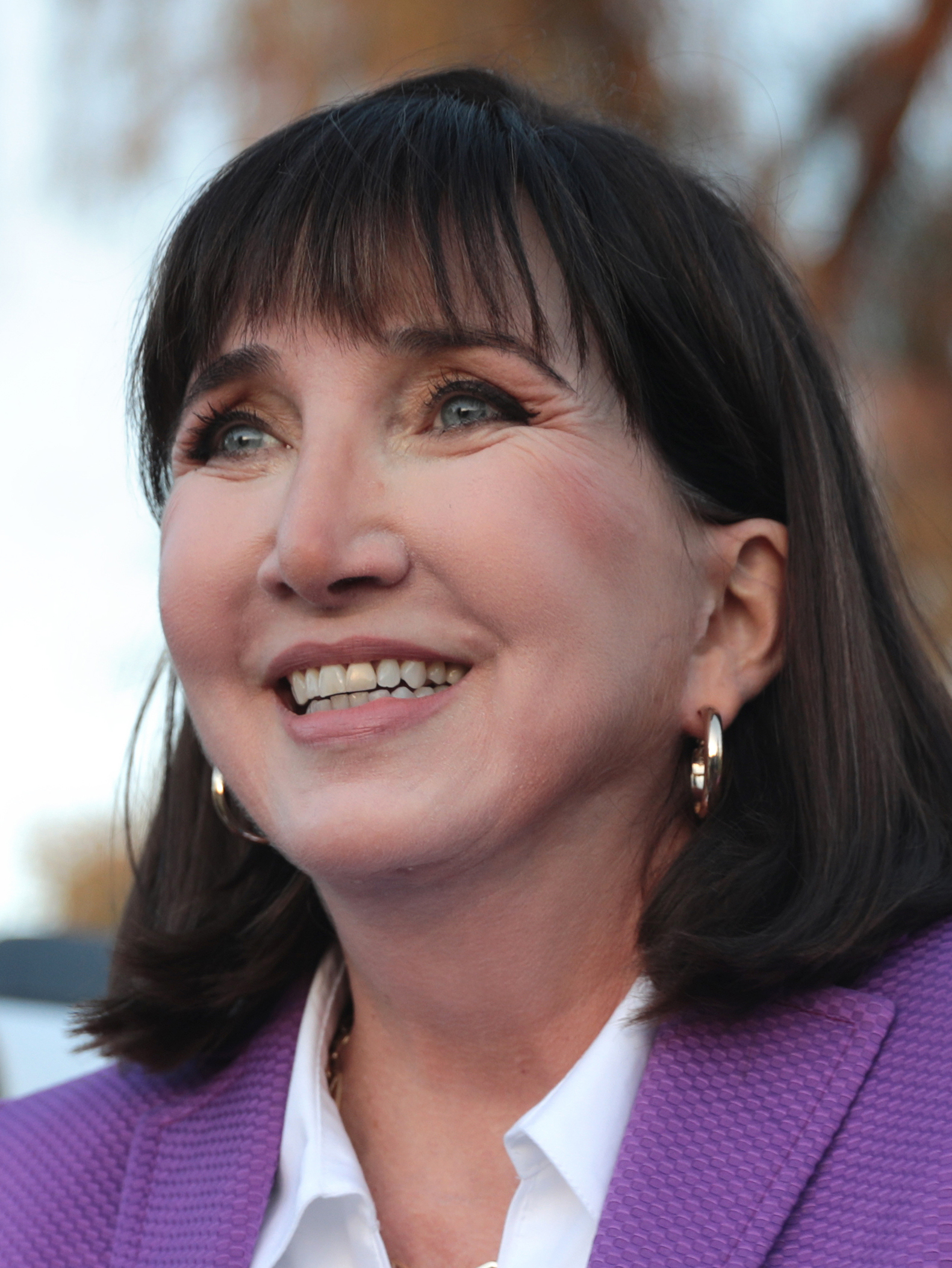

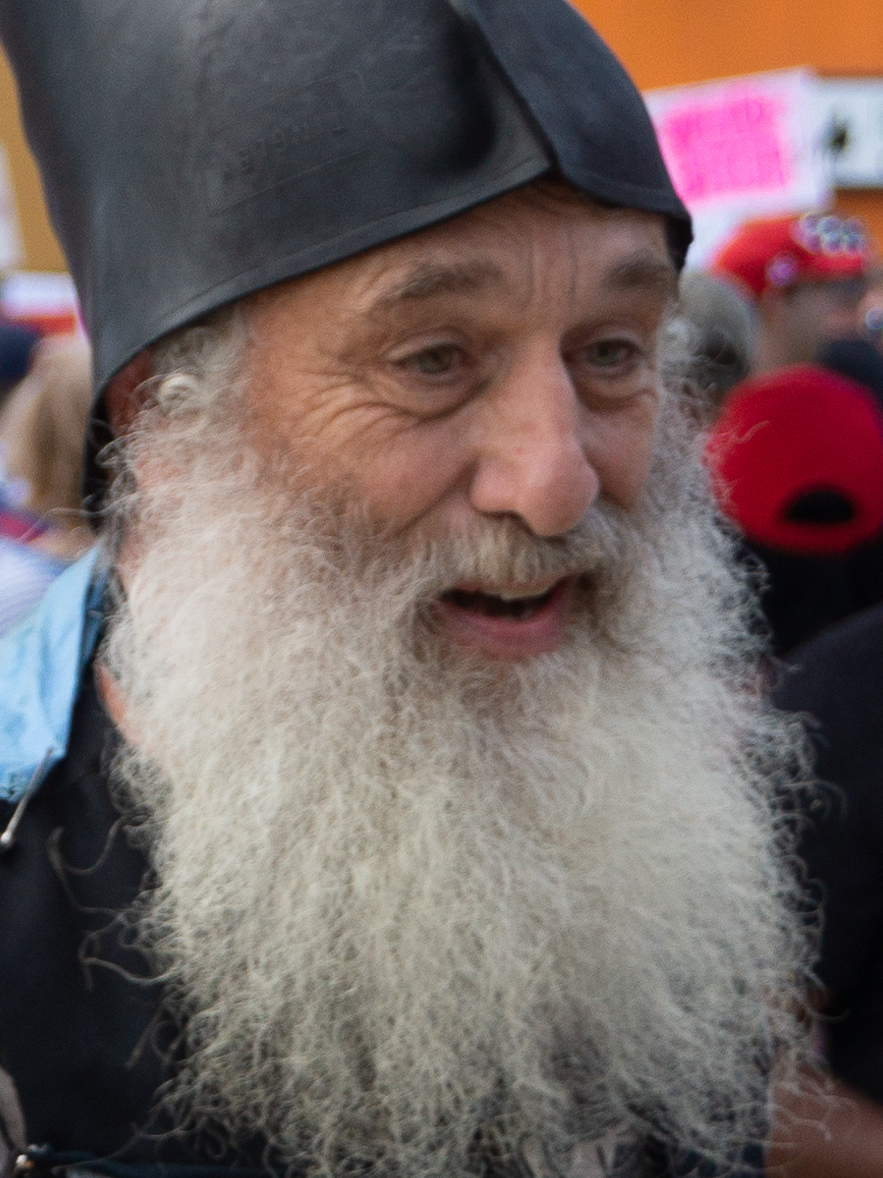

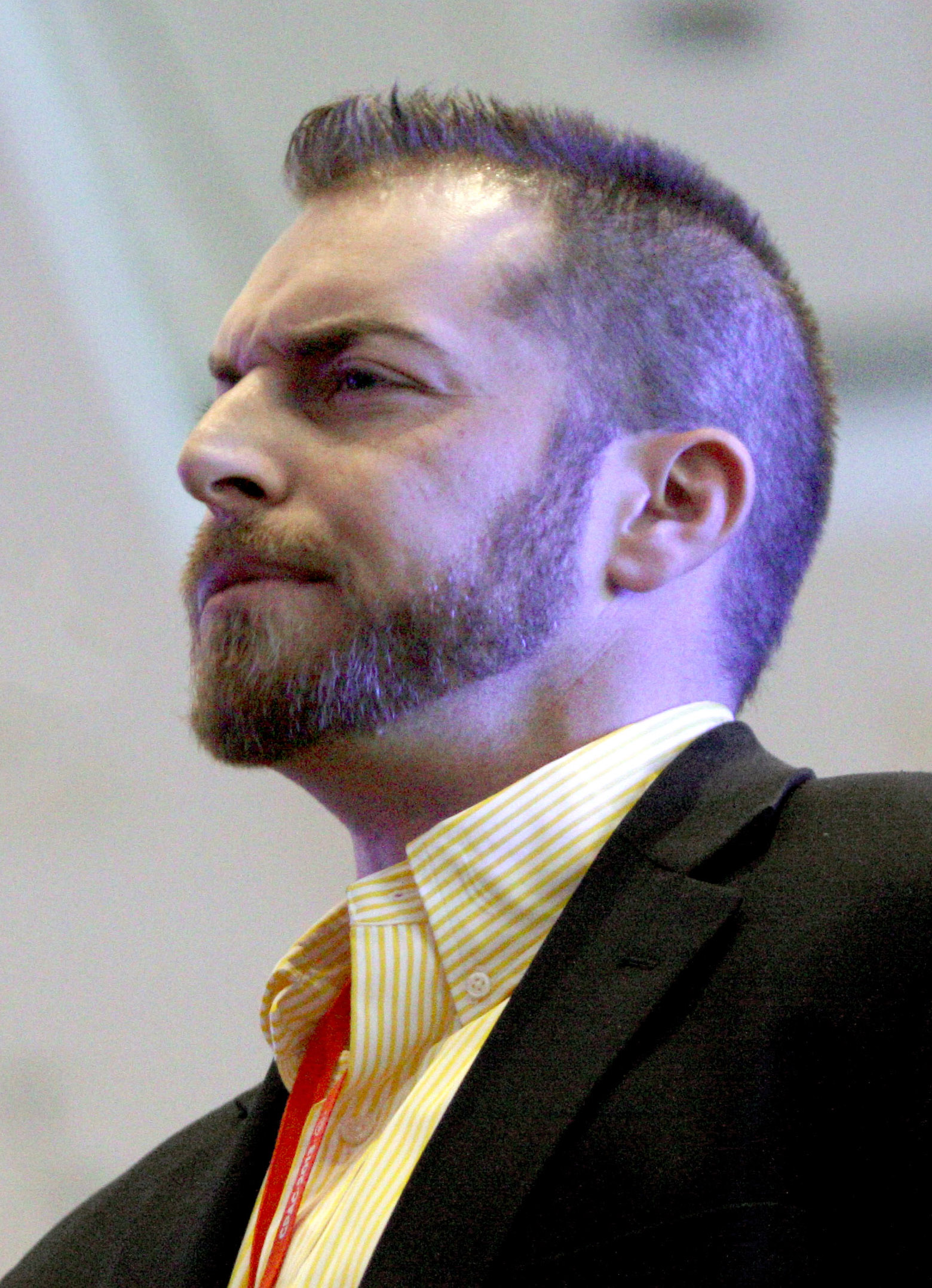

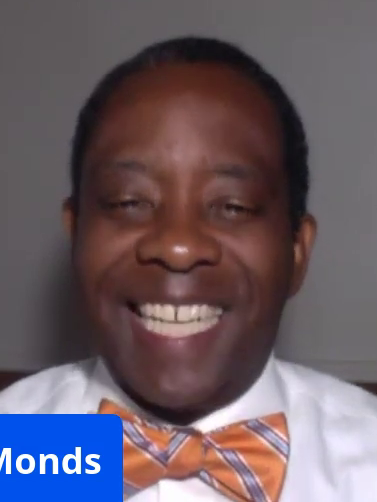

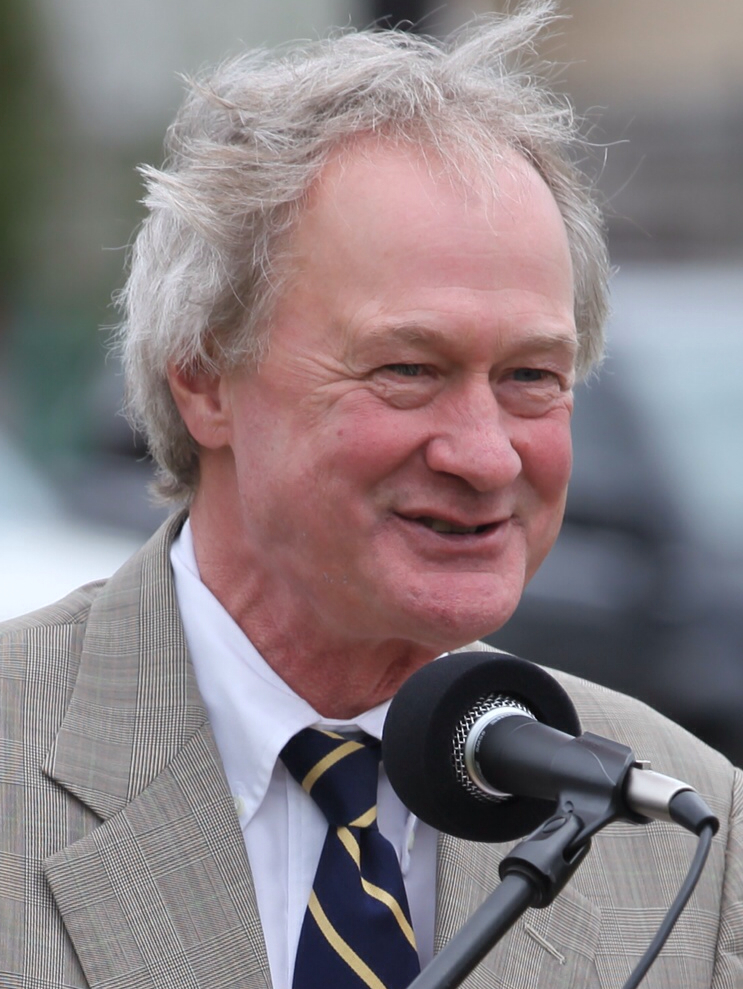

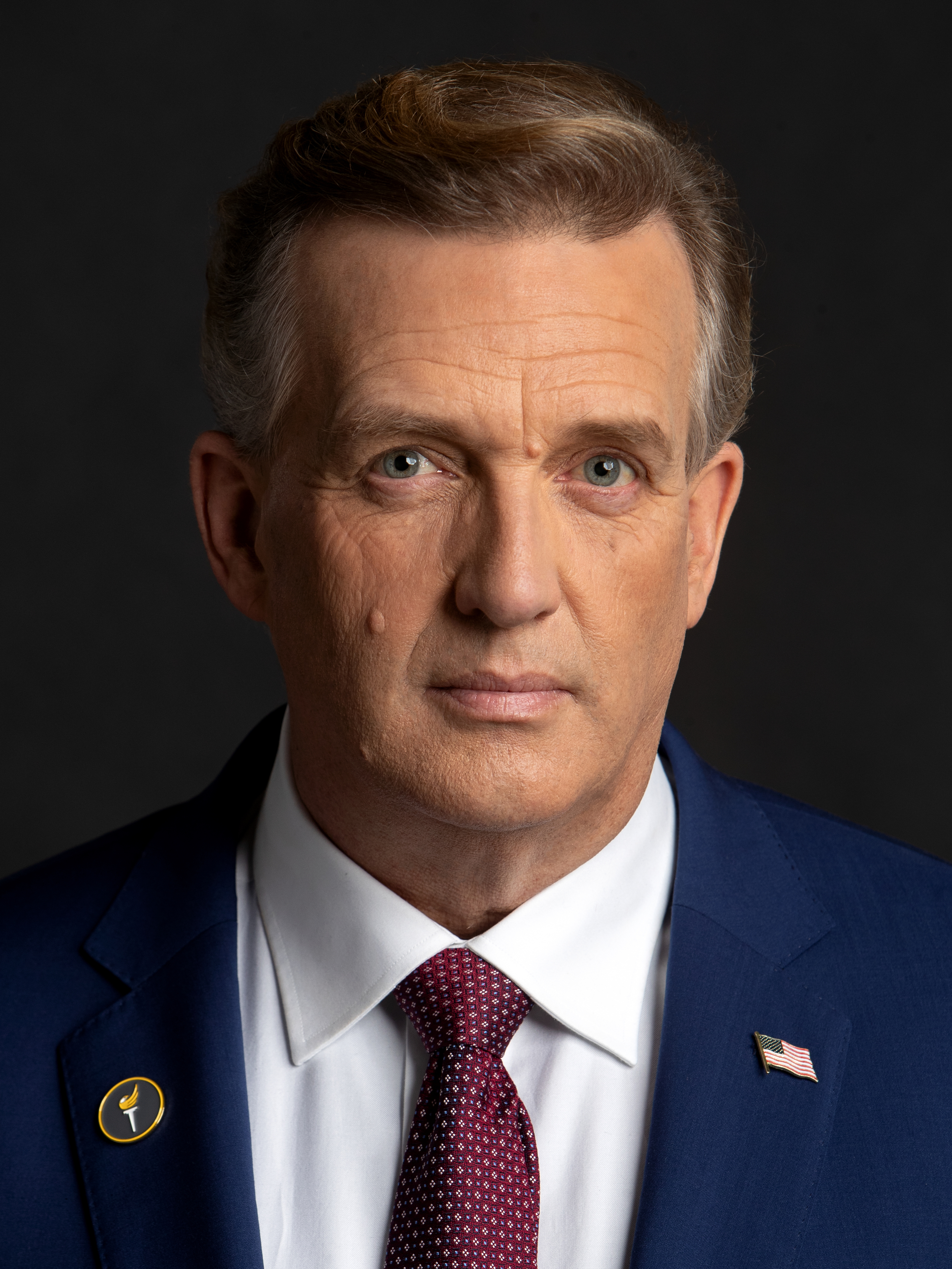
Candidate	Jacob Hornberger	Jo Jorgensen	Vermin Supreme
Home state	Virginia	South Carolina	Massachusetts
First vote	37 (38.1%)	12 (12.4%)	11 (11.3%)
Final vote	47 (59.5%)	32 (40.5%)	Eliminated
Candidate	Adam Kokesh	John Monds	Lincoln Chafee
Home state	Indiana	Georgia	Wyoming
First vote	6 (6.2%)	6 (6.2%)	6 (6.2%)
Final vote	Eliminated	Eliminated	Eliminated
Candidate	Mark Whitney
Home state	California
First vote	6 (6.2%)
Final vote	Eliminated
First alignment vote congressional district results
Jacob Hornberger Jo Jorgensen Vermin Supreme	Lincoln Chafee Tie

The Libertarian Party of Minnesota used ranked-choice voting to tabulate the results of their caucus. After 7 rounds, Jacob Hornberger was declared the winner.

Minnesota Libertarian presidential caucus, February 25, 2020
Candidate	Round 1			Round 7	
Candidate	Votes	%	Transfer	Votes	%
Jacob Hornberger	37	38.1%	+ 10	47	59.5%
Jo Jorgensen	12	12.4%	+ 20	32	40.5%
Vermin Supreme	11	11.3%	11	Eliminated	
Adam Kokesh	6	6.2%	6	Eliminated	
John Monds	6	6.2%	6	Eliminated	
Lincoln Chafee	6	6.2%	6	Eliminated	
Mark Whitney	6	6.2%	6	Eliminated	
N.O.T.A.	4	4.1%	4	Eliminated	
Arvin Vohra	2	2.1%	2	Eliminated	
Ken Armstrong	2	2.1%	2	Eliminated	
Sam Robb	2	2.1%	2	Eliminated	
Keenan Wallace Dunham	1	1.0%	1	Eliminated	
Sorinne Ardeleanu	1	1.0%	1	Eliminated	
Abrahamson [sic] (write-in)	1	1.0%	1	Eliminated	
Dan "Taxation is Theft" Behrman	0	0.0%	Eliminated		
Jedi Hill	0	0.0%	Eliminated		
Souraya Faas	0	0.0%	Eliminated		
Steven Richey	0	0.0%	Eliminated		
Round 1 Total	97	100.0%	Round 7 Total	79	100.0%

Minnesota Libertarian vice presidential caucus, February 25, 2020
Candidate	Round 1			Round 2	
Candidate	Votes	%	Transfer	Votes	%
Jeff Wood	32	40.0%	+ 0	32	52.5%
Spike Cohen	29	36.3%	+ 0	29	47.5%
NOTA	19	23.8%	19	Eliminated	
Round 1 Total	80	100.0%	Round 2 Total	61	100.0%

== General election ==
=== Final predictions ===
Source	Ranking
The Cook Political Report	Lean D
Inside Elections	Likely D
Sabato's Crystal Ball	Likely D
Politico	Lean D
RCP	Tossup
Niskanen	Likely D
CNN	Lean D
The Economist	Likely D
CBS News	Lean D
270towin	Likely D
ABC News	Lean D
NPR	Lean D
NBC News	Lean D
FiveThirtyEight	Solid D

=== Polling ===
View source data.

==== Aggregate polls ====
Source of poll aggregation	Dates administered	Dates updated	Joe Biden DFL	Donald Trump Republican	Other/ Undecided (Note: Calculated by taking the difference of 100% and all other candidates combined.)	Margin
270 to Win	October 27 – November 2, 2020	November 3, 2020	51.6%	41.8%	6.6%	Biden +9.8
Real Clear Politics	October 12–27, 2020	November 3, 2020	48.0%	43.7%	8.3%	Biden +4.3
FiveThirtyEight	until November 2, 2020	November 3, 2020	51.8%	42.7%	5.5%	Biden +9.2
Average			50.5%	42.7%	6.8%	Biden +7.8

Polls

Poll source	Date(s) administered	Sample size (Note: Key: A – all adults RV – registered voters LV – likely voters V – unclear)	Margin of error	Donald Trump Republican	Joe Biden DFL	Jo Jorgensen Libertarian	Howie Hawkins Green	Other	Undecided
SurveyMonkey/Axios	Oct 20 – Nov 2, 2020	3,031 (LV)	± 2.5%	41% (Note: Overlapping sample with the previous SurveyMonkey/Axios poll, but more information available regarding sample size)	56%	-	-	–	–
Research Co.	Oct 31 – Nov 1, 2020	450 (LV)	± 4.6%	45%	54%	-	-	1% (Note: "Someone else" with 1%)	4%
Data for Progress	Oct 27 – Nov 1, 2020	1,259 (LV)	± 2.8%	43%	51%	4%	2%	1% (Note: "Other candidate or write-in" with 1%)	–
Swayable	Oct 23 – Nov 1, 2020	466 (LV)	± 5.9%	43%	53%	4%	0%	–	–
Morning Consult	Oct 22–31, 2020	883 (LV)	± 3.0%	42%	52%	-	-	–	–
Public Policy Polling	Oct 29–30, 2020	770 (V)	–	43%	54%	-	-	2% (Note: "Someone else" with 2%)	1%
Targoz Market Research/PollSmart	Oct 25–30, 2020	1,138 (LV)	–	44%	53%	-	-	3% (Note: "Not sure/Someone else/Undecided" with 3%)	–
St. Cloud State University	Oct 10–29, 2020	372 (A)	± 6.7%	39%	54%	-	-	–	–
SurveyMonkey/Axios	Oct 1–28, 2020	5,498 (LV)	–	42%	55%	-	-	–	–
SurveyUSA/KSTP/ABC6 News	Oct 23–27, 2020	649 (LV)	± 4.3%	42%	47%	-	-	5% (Note: "Some other candidate" with 5%)	6%
Gravis Marketing	Oct 24–26, 2020	657 (LV)	± 3.8%	39%	53%	-	-	–	8%
Trafalgar Group	Oct 24–25, 2020	1,065 (LV)	± 2.92%	45%	48%	2%	-	4% (Note: West (B) with 3%; "Someone else" with 1%)	1%
Civiqs/Daily Kos	Oct 17–20, 2020	840 (LV)	± 3.6%	43%	53%	-	-	3% (Note: "Someone else" with 3%)	1%
SurveyUSA/KSTP	Oct 16–20, 2020	625 (LV)	± 5%	42%	48%	-	-	–	–
Morning Consult	Oct 11–20, 2020	864 (LV)	± 3.3%	42%	51%	-	-	–	–
Change Research/MinnPost	Oct 12–15, 2020 (Note: Additional data sourced from FiveThirtyEight)	1,021 (LV)	± 3.1%	44%	49%	2%	0%	2% (Note: "Another Third Party Candidate" and West (B) with 1%; would not vote with 0%)	2%
David Binder Research/Focus on Rural America	Oct 10–13, 2020	200 (LV)	–	41%	52%	-	-	–	–
Morning Consult	Oct 2–11, 2020	898 (LV)	± 3.3%	44%	50%	-	-	–	–
SurveyUSA/ABC6 News	Oct 1–6, 2020	929 (LV)	± 3.9%	40%	47%	-	-	3% (Note: "Some other candidate" with 3%)	10%
SurveyMonkey/Axios	Sep 1–30, 2020	2,808 (LV)	–	43%	55%	-	-	–	2%
Suffolk University	Sep 20–24, 2020	500 (LV)	± 4.4%	40%	47%	2%	0%	4% (Note: "Refused" with 2%; Fuente (A), "Other" and West (B) with 1%; Pierce (I) with 0%; Kennedy (SWP) and La Riva (PSOL) with no voters)	6%
Mason-Dixon/StarTribune /MPR News/KARE 11	Sep 21–23, 2020	800 (LV)	± 3.5%	42%	48%	-	-	2%	8%
Redfield & Wilton Strategies	Sep 12–17, 2020	718 (LV)	± 3.66%	42%	51%	0%	0%	1% (Note: "Another Third Party/Write-in" with 1%)	5%
ABC/Washington Post	Sep 8–13, 2020	615 (LV)	± 4.5%	41%	57%	-	-	1% (Note: "Neither" with 1%; "Other" and would not vote with 0%)	1%
Morning Consult	Sep 4–13, 2020	643 (LV)	± 4%	44% (Note: Overlapping sample with the previous Morning Consult poll, but more information available regarding sample size)	48%	-	-	2%	6%
YouGov/CBS	Sep 9–11, 2020	1,087 (LV)	± 3.9%	41%	50%	-	-	2% (Note: "Someone else/third party" with 2%)	6%
Siena College/NYT Upshot	Sep 8–10, 2020	814 (LV)	± 3.9%	41%	50%	2%	1%	0% (Note: "Someone else" and would not vote with 0%)	5% (Note: Includes "Refused")
SurveyUSA	Sep 4–7, 2020	553 (LV)	± 5.2%	40%	49%	-	-	4% (Note: "Some other candidate" with 4%)	7%
Morning Consult	Aug 29 – Sep 7, 2020	649 (LV)	± (2%–4%)	44%	49%	-	-	–	–
PPP	Sep 3–4, 2020	877 (V)	± 3.3%	44%	52%	-	-	3%	1%
Harper Polling/Jason Lewis (Note: Poll sponsored by Lewis' campaign)	Aug 30 – Sep 1, 2020	501 (LV)	± 4.38%	45%	48%	–	–	–	4%
SurveyMonkey/Axios	Aug 1–31, 2020	1,939 (LV)	–	43%	56%	-	-	–	1%
Morning Consult	Aug 21–30, 2020	647 (LV)	± (2%–4%)	43%	50%	-	-	–	–
Trafalgar Group	Aug 15–18, 2020	1,141 (LV)	± 3.0%	47%	47%	4%	-	1% (Note: "Another Party Candidate" with 1%)	2%
Morning Consult	Aug 7–16, 2020	615 (LV)	± (2%–4%)	42%	50%	-	-	–	–
Emerson College	Aug 8–10, 2020	733 (LV)	± 3.6%	49% (Note: Including voters who lean towards a given candidate)	51%	-	-	–	–
David Binder Research	Jul 30–31, 2020	200 (LV)	–	36%	54%	-	-	–	–
SurveyMonkey/Axios	Jul 1–31, 2020	2,288 (LV)	–	47%	51%	-	-	–	2%
Morning Consult	Jul 17–26, 2020	662 (LV)	± 3.8%	44%	47%	-	-	–	–
Trafalgar Group	Jul 23–25, 2020	1,129 (LV)	± 2.8%	44%	49%	2%	-	3% (Note: "Another Party Candidate")	2%
Public Policy Polling/Giffords (Note: Poll sponsored by Giffords, whose founder, Gabby Giffords, had endorsed Biden prior to the sampling period)	Jul 22–23, 2020	1,218 (V)	± 3.2%	42%	52%	-	-	–	6%
FOX News	Jul 18–20, 2020	776 (RV)	± 3.5%	38%	51%	-	-	6% (Note: "Other" with 5%; would not vote with 1%)	6%
SurveyMonkey/Axios	Jun 8–30, 2020	860 (LV)	–	42%	57%	-	-	–	1%
Gravis Marketing	Jun 19, 2020	600 (RV)	± 4.0%	42% (Note: Including undecided voters who lean towards Trump)	58% (Note: Including undecided voters who lean towards Biden)	-	-	–	–
Morning Consult	May 27– Jun 5, 2020	600 (LV)	± 4%	45%	48%	-	-	–	–
Harper Polling/Jason Lewis	May 26–28, 2020	510 (LV)	–	42%	50%	–	–	–	8%
Morning Consult	May 17–26, 2020	647 (LV)	–	42%	49%	-	-	–	–
Mason-Dixon/StarTribune /MPR News/KARE 11	May 18–20, 2020	800 (RV)	± 3.5%	44%	49%	-	-	–	7%
Morning Consult	May 7–16, 2020	600 (LV)	± 4%	38%	55%	-	-	–	–
Mason-Dixon/StarTribune	Oct 14–16, 2019	800 (RV)	± 3.5%	38%	50%	-	-	–	12%

Former candidates

Donald Trump vs. Amy Klobuchar

Poll source	Date(s) administered	Sample size	Margin of error	Donald Trump (R)	Amy Klobuchar (DFL)	Other	Undecided
Mason-Dixon Polling & Research Inc./StarTribune	Oct 14–16, 2019	800 (RV)	± 3.5%	38%	55%	–	7%
DFM Research	Feb 26 – Mar 3, 2019	550 (A)	± 4.2%	35%	52%	7% (Note: For Howard Schultz as independent)	6% (Note: Listed as "unsure/other/refused")

Donald Trump vs. Bernie Sanders

Poll source	Date(s) administered	Sample size	Margin of error	Donald Trump (R)	Bernie Sanders (DFL)	Other	Undecided
Mason-Dixon/StarTribune	Oct 14–16, 2019	800 (RV)	± 3.5%	40%	49%	–	11%

Donald Trump vs. Elizabeth Warren

Poll source	Date(s) administered	Sample size	Margin of error	Donald Trump (R)	Elizabeth Warren (DFL)	Other	Undecided
Mason-Dixon Polling & Research Inc./StarTribune	Oct 14–16, 2019	800 (RV)	± 3.5%	40%	51%	–	11%

Hypothetical polling

with Donald Trump and generic Democrat

Poll source	Date(s) administered	Sample size	Margin of error	Donald Trump (R)	Generic Democrat	Undecided
KFF/Cook Political Report	Sep 23 – Oct 15, 2019	958 (RV)	± 4%	28%	41%	21%
Public Policy Polling (Note: Poll sponsored by the Alliance for a Better Minnesota)	Oct 4–6, 2019	1,175 (V)	–	42%	52%	6%
Public Policy Polling	Jun 15–16, 2018	717 (V)	–	41%	51%	8%

with Donald Trump, generic Democrat, and Howard Schultz

Poll source	Date(s) administered	Sample size	Margin of error	Donald Trump (R)	Generic Democrat	Howard Schultz (I)	Undecided
DFM Research	Feb 26 – Mar 3, 2019	550 (A)	± 4.2%	35%	45%	6%	15%

=== Results ===
2020 United States presidential election in Minnesota
Party	Candidate	Votes	%	±%
Democratic (DFL)	Joe Biden Kamala Harris	1,717,077	52.40%	+5.96%
Republican	Donald Trump Mike Pence	1,484,065	45.28%	+0.35%
Libertarian	Jo Jorgensen Spike Cohen	34,976	1.07%	−2.77%
Green	Howie Hawkins Angela Walker	10,033	0.31%	−0.95%
Independent	Kanye West Michelle Tidball	7,940	0.24%	−
Independent	Brock Pierce Karla Ballard	5,651	0.17%	−
Alliance	Rocky De La Fuente Darcy Richardson	5,611	0.17%	−
Socialism and Liberation	Gloria La Riva Leonard Peltier	1,210	0.04%	−
Socialist Workers	Alyson Kennedy Malcolm Jarrett	643	0.02%	−0.04%
Write-in		9,965	0.3%	-0.6%
Total votes		3,277,171	100%	
Democratic (DFL) hold				

==== By county ====
County	Joe Biden DFL		Donald Trump Republican		Various candidates Other parties		Margin		Total votes cast
County	#	%	#	%	#	%	#	%	Total votes cast
Aitkin	3,607	35.98%	6,258	62.42%	160	1.60%	-2,651	-26.44%	10,025
Anoka	100,893	47.79%	104,902	49.69%	5,337	2.52%	-4,009	-1.90%	211,132
Becker	6,589	33.96%	12,438	64.11%	374	1.93%	-5,849	-30.15%	19,401
Beltrami	11,426	47.24%	12,188	50.39%	575	2.37%	-762	-3.15%	24,189
Benton	7,280	32.70%	14,382	64.61%	598	2.69%	-7,102	-31.91%	22,260
Big Stone	1,053	35.41%	1,863	62.64%	58	1.95%	-810	-27.23%	2,974
Blue Earth	18,330	50.84%	16,731	46.41%	990	2.75%	1,599	4.43%	36,051
Brown	4,753	32.48%	9,552	65.27%	330	2.25%	-4,799	-32.79%	14,635
Carlton	10,098	49.58%	9,791	48.07%	480	2.35%	307	1.51%	20,369
Carver	30,774	46.37%	34,009	51.25%	1,578	2.38%	-3,235	-4.88%	66,361
Cass	6,342	34.68%	11,620	63.54%	327	1.78%	-5,278	-28.86%	18,289
Chippewa	2,226	33.67%	4,250	64.29%	135	2.04%	-2,024	-30.62%	6,611
Chisago	11,806	34.15%	21,916	63.40%	848	2.45%	-10,110	-29.25%	34,570
Clay	16,357	50.74%	15,043	46.66%	839	2.60%	1,314	4.08%	32,239
Clearwater	1,260	26.76%	3,372	71.62%	76	1.62%	-2,112	-44.86%	4,708
Cook	2,496	65.58%	1,203	31.61%	107	2.81%	1,293	33.97%	3,806
Cottonwood	1,834	30.03%	4,165	68.20%	108	1.77%	-2,331	-38.17%	6,107
Crow Wing	13,726	34.17%	25,676	63.91%	771	1.92%	-11,950	-29.74%	40,173
Dakota	146,155	55.73%	109,638	41.81%	6,466	2.46%	36,517	13.92%	262,259
Dodge	4,079	33.47%	7,783	63.86%	325	2.67%	-3,704	-30.39%	12,187
Douglas	7,868	32.56%	15,799	65.38%	498	2.06%	-7,931	-32.82%	24,165
Faribault	2,531	31.98%	5,191	65.59%	192	2.43%	-2,660	-33.61%	7,914
Fillmore	4,551	37.48%	7,301	60.14%	289	2.38%	-2,750	-22.66%	12,141
Freeborn	6,889	40.96%	9,578	56.95%	351	2.09%	-2,689	-15.99%	16,818
Goodhue	11,806	41.23%	16,052	56.06%	778	2.71%	-4,246	-14.83%	28,636
Grant	1,300	35.58%	2,269	62.10%	85	2.32%	-969	-26.52%	3,654
Hennepin	532,623	70.46%	205,973	27.25%	17,373	2.29%	326,650	43.21%	755,969
Houston	4,853	42.42%	6,334	55.37%	253	2.21%	-1,481	-12.95%	11,440
Hubbard	4,462	34.42%	8,202	63.26%	301	2.32%	-3,740	-28.84%	12,965
Isanti	7,138	29.45%	16,491	68.05%	606	2.50%	-9,353	-38.60%	24,235
Itasca	10,786	40.61%	15,239	57.37%	536	2.02%	-4,453	-16.76%	26,561
Jackson	1,745	29.99%	3,948	67.85%	126	2.16%	-2,203	-37.86%	5,819
Kanabec	2,774	30.02%	6,278	67.93%	190	2.05%	-3,504	-37.91%	9,242
Kandiyohi	8,440	36.12%	14,437	61.78%	490	2.10%	-5,997	-25.66%	23,367
Kittson	1,006	38.12%	1,546	58.58%	87	3.30%	-540	-20.46%	2,639
Koochiching	2,659	38.41%	4,131	59.68%	132	1.91%	-1,472	-21.27%	6,922
Lac Qui Parle	1,446	35.79%	2,528	62.57%	66	1.64%	-1,082	-26.78%	4,040
Lake	3,647	50.64%	3,393	47.11%	162	2.25%	254	3.53%	7,202
Lake of the Woods	671	27.87%	1,704	70.76%	33	1.37%	-1,033	-42.89%	2,408
Le Sueur	5,672	33.73%	10,775	64.07%	371	2.20%	-5,103	-30.34%	16,818
Lincoln	937	30.08%	2,121	68.09%	57	1.83%	-1,184	-38.01%	3,115
Lyon	4,634	35.94%	7,979	61.89%	280	2.17%	-3,345	-25.95%	12,893
McLeod	6,413	30.64%	13,986	66.81%	534	2.55%	-7,573	-36.17%	20,933
Mahnomen	1,112	48.26%	1,142	49.57%	50	2.17%	-30	-1.31%	2,304
Marshall	1,295	25.33%	3,721	72.78%	97	1.89%	-2,426	-47.45%	5,113
Martin	3,305	30.02%	7,480	67.94%	224	2.04%	-4,175	-37.72%	11,009
Meeker	3,867	28.58%	9,359	69.18%	303	2.24%	-5,492	-40.60%	13,529
Mille Lacs	4,404	29.98%	9,952	67.75%	333	2.27%	-5,548	-37.77%	14,689
Morrison	4,367	22.33%	14,821	75.78%	370	1.89%	-10,454	-53.45%	19,558
Mower	8,899	46.00%	10,025	51.82%	421	2.18%	-1,126	-5.82%	19,345
Murray	1,449	29.60%	3,363	68.69%	84	1.71%	-1,914	-39.09%	4,896
Nicollet	9,622	50.31%	9,018	47.15%	485	2.54%	604	3.16%	19,125
Nobles	2,933	33.65%	5,600	64.26%	182	2.09%	-2,667	-30.61%	8,715
Norman	1,404	40.80%	1,953	56.76%	84	2.44%	-549	-15.96%	3,441
Olmsted	49,491	54.16%	39,692	43.43%	2,202	2.41%	9,799	10.73%	91,385
Otter Tail	11,958	32.85%	23,800	65.39%	641	1.76%	-11,842	-32.54%	36,399
Pennington	2,568	35.29%	4,532	62.28%	177	2.43%	-1,964	-26.99%	7,277
Pine	5,419	33.87%	10,256	64.10%	326	2.03%	-4,837	-30.23%	16,001
Pipestone	1,306	26.44%	3,553	71.92%	81	1.64%	-2,247	-45.48%	4,940
Polk	5,439	34.88%	9,865	63.26%	290	1.86%	-4,426	-28.38%	15,594
Pope	2,477	35.27%	4,417	62.90%	128	1.83%	-1,940	-27.63%	7,022
Ramsey	211,620	71.50%	77,376	26.14%	6,981	2.36%	134,244	45.36%	295,977
Red Lake	691	31.47%	1,454	66.21%	51	2.32%	-763	-34.74%	2,196
Redwood	2,355	28.43%	5,771	69.66%	158	1.91%	-3,416	-41.23%	8,284
Renville	2,496	30.71%	5,467	67.26%	165	2.03%	-2,971	-36.55%	8,128
Rice	17,402	48.76%	17,464	48.94%	820	2.30%	-62	-0.18%	35,686
Rock	1,556	29.69%	3,583	68.38%	101	1.93%	-2,027	-38.69%	5,240
Roseau	2,188	25.98%	6,065	72.02%	168	2.00%	-3,877	-46.04%	8,421
St. Louis	67,704	56.64%	49,017	41.01%	2,810	2.35%	18,687	15.63%	119,531
Scott	40,040	45.52%	45,872	52.15%	2,053	2.33%	-5,832	-6.63%	87,965
Sherburne	18,065	32.48%	36,222	65.13%	1,325	2.39%	-18,157	-32.65%	55,612
Sibley	2,417	28.60%	5,864	69.38%	171	2.02%	-3,447	-40.78%	8,452
Stearns	31,879	37.58%	50,959	60.07%	1,997	2.35%	-19,080	-22.49%	84,835
Steele	7,917	37.47%	12,656	59.90%	555	2.63%	-4,739	-22.43%	21,128
Stevens	1,922	37.80%	3,044	59.86%	119	2.34%	-1,122	-22.06%	5,085
Swift	1,784	34.35%	3,316	63.86%	93	1.79%	-1,532	-29.51%	5,193
Todd	3,286	24.79%	9,753	73.57%	218	1.64%	-6,467	-48.78%	13,257
Traverse	661	35.46%	1,172	62.88%	31	1.66%	-511	-27.42%	1,864
Wabasha	4,696	35.78%	8,153	62.13%	274	2.09%	-3,457	-26.35%	13,123
Wadena	2,023	26.35%	5,520	71.90%	134	1.75%	-3,497	-45.55%	7,677
Waseca	3,496	33.65%	6,624	63.76%	269	2.59%	-3,128	-30.11%	10,389
Washington	89,165	53.46%	73,764	44.23%	3,857	2.31%	15,401	9.23%	166,786
Watonwan	1,987	38.20%	3,103	59.66%	111	2.14%	-1,116	-21.46%	5,201
Wilkin	1,026	29.91%	2,328	67.87%	76	2.22%	-1,302	-37.96%	3,430
Winona	13,333	49.07%	13,227	48.68%	613	2.25%	106	0.39%	27,173
Wright	28,430	34.49%	51,973	63.05%	2,023	2.46%	-23,543	-28.56%	82,426
Yellow Medicine	1,688	30.54%	3,734	67.55%	106	1.91%	-2,046	-37.01%	5,528
Totals	1,717,077	52.40%	1,484,065	45.28%	76,029	2.32%	233,012	7.12%	3,277,171

Counties that flipped from Republican to Democratic

- Blue Earth (largest municipality: Mankato)
- Clay (largest municipality: Moorhead)
- Nicollet (largest municipality: North Mankato)
- Winona (largest municipality: Winona)

==== By congressional district ====
Biden and Trump each won four of the state's eight congressional districts. Neither won any district in Minnesota represented by the other party in the House of Representatives, although incumbent Democrat Collin Peterson was unseated in the Trump-won 7th district.

District	Biden	Trump	Representative
1st	44%	54%	Jim Hagedorn
2nd	52%	45%	Angie Craig
3rd	58%	39%	Dean Phillips
4th	67%	30%	Betty McCollum
5th	80%	18%	Ilhan Omar
6th	39%	59%	Tom Emmer
7th	34%	64%	Collin Peterson
7th	34%	64%	Michelle Fischbach
8th	42%	56%	Pete Stauber

== Analysis ==
After narrowly losing the state in 2016, the Trump campaign identified Minnesota as an offensive target in 2020; polls of Minnesota voters throughout the campaign, however, showed Biden leading. Throughout the summer leading up to the election, the Twin Cities metropolitan area was the epicenter of Black Lives Matter protests, in light of the murder of George Floyd having taken place in Minneapolis.

Trump attempted to court white suburban Minnesotans with law and order messaging by using images of rioting in campaign ads and claiming that Biden would "destroy suburbia". These efforts failed, as Biden massively improved on Hillary Clinton's performance in the Twin Cities suburbs. With his resounding victories in Hennepin and Ramsey counties, Biden became the first Democrat to win over 70% of the vote in any Minnesota county since Minnesotan Hubert Humphrey did in Carlton, Lake, and St. Louis Counties (the core of the heavily unionized Iron Range region) in 1968.

=== Voter demographics ===
Edison Research exit poll
Demographic subgroup	Biden	Trump	No Answer	% of Voters
Party
Democrat	95	4	N/A	35
Republican	8	91	N/A	34
Independent	55	40	N/A	31
Gender
Men	47	50	3	46
Women	58	41	1	54
Race
White	51	47	2	87
Black	77	21	2	4
Latino	60	38	2	4
Asian	N/A	N/A	N/A	2
Other	N/A	N/A	N/A	3
Gender by race/ethnicity
White men	44	53	3	45
White women	57	42	1	55
Black men	69	30	1	6
Black women	N/A	N/A	N/A	2
Latino men (of any race)	N/A	N/A	N/A	3
Latino women (of any race)	63	35	2	4
All other races	N/A	N/A	N/A	3
Marital status
Married	49	50	1	59
Not married	58	39	3	41
Age
18–24 years old	66	29	N/A	8
25–29 years old	64	30	N/A	6
30–39 years old	54	43	3	15
40–49 years old	52	47	1	13
50–64 years old	51	48	N/A	29
65 and older	48	51	1	30
Sexual orientation
LGBT	N/A	N/A	N/A	5
Heterosexual	51	47	2	95
Education
College graduate	65	34	N/A	43
No college degree	45	53	1	57
Education by race/ethnicity
White college graduates	62	35	3	39
White no college degree	42	57	N/A	48
Non-white college graduates	73	25	3	4
Non-white no college degree	64	32	4	9
Income
Under $30,000	58	40	2	16
$30,000–$49,999	55	39	6	19
Over $200,000	58	42	N/A	9
Racism in the U.S is
The most important problem	85	14	1	9
An important problem	62	35	3	65
Area Type
Urban	68	29	1	44
Suburban	42	56	2	34
Rural	46	52	2	16
Source: CNN

== See also ==
- United States presidential elections in Minnesota
- 2020 United States presidential election
- 2020 Democratic Party presidential primaries
- 2020 Republican Party presidential primaries
- 2020 United States elections
- 2020 Minnesota elections

== Notes ==
Partisan clients
