= Wells Township, Rice County, Minnesota =

Wells Township, Minnesota
- Township
- Location within the state of Minnesota Wells Township, Minnesota (the United States)
- Coordinates: 44°19′14″N 93°20′17″W
- Country: United States
- State: Minnesota
- County: Rice

Area
  - Total: 32.0 sq mi (82.8 km^{2})
  - Land: 28.0 sq mi (72.6 km^{2})
  - Water: 3.9 sq mi (10.2 km^{2})
- Elevation: 1,020 ft (310 m)

Population (2000)
  - Total: 1,743
  - Density: 62/sq mi (24/km^{2})
- Time zone: UTC-6 (Central (CST))
  - Summer (DST): UTC-5 (CDT)
- FIPS code: 27-69124
- GNIS feature ID: 0665951

Wells Township is a township in Rice County, Minnesota, United States. The population was 1,743 at the 2000 census.

Settled in the 1850s, Wells Township was named for James "Bully" Wells, an early settler.

== Geography ==
According to the United States Census Bureau, the township has a total area of 32.0 square miles (82.9 km^{2}), of which 28.0 square miles (72.6 km^{2}) is land and 4.0 square miles (10.2 km^{2}) (12.35%) is water.

== Demographics ==
As of the census of 2000, there were 1,743 people, 650 households, and 501 families residing in the township. The population density was 62.2 inhabitants per square mile (24.0/km^{2}). There were 949 housing units at an average density of 33.9 per square mile (13.1/km^{2}). The racial makeup of the township was 98.22% White, 0.34% African American, 0.23% Native American, 0.11% Asian, 0.75% from other races, and 0.34% from two or more races. Hispanic or Latino of any race were 2.64% of the population.

There were 650 households, out of which 32.8% had children under the age of 18 living with them, 69.4% were married couples living together, 4.0% had a female householder with no husband present, and 22.9% were non-families. 17.7% of all households were made up of individuals, and 5.2% had someone living alone who was 65 years of age or older. The average household size was 2.68 and the average family size was 3.04.

In the township the population was spread out, with 23.9% under the age of 18, 8.1% from 18 to 24, 26.0% from 25 to 44, 30.6% from 45 to 64, and 11.4% who were 65 years of age or older. The median age was 40 years. For every 100 females, there were 108.5 males. For every 100 females age 18 and over, there were 112.7 males.

The median income for a household in the township was $52,155, and the median income for a family was $60,125. Males had a median income of $38,417 versus $25,850 for females. The per capita income for the township was $24,714. About 3.3% of families and 4.6% of the population were below the poverty line, including 5.0% of those under age 18 and 12.1% of those age 65 or over.

== See also ==
- Roberds Lake
