= Circle Lake =

Lake in the state of Minnesota, United States

- Location within Minnesota
- Location: Rice County, Minnesota
- Coordinates: 44°24′45″N 93°20′45″W
- Type: lake

Circle Lake is a lake in Rice County, in the U.S. state of Minnesota.

Circle Lake was so named for the fact part of the lake forms a rough circle around a lake island.
