= Mazaska Lake =

Lake in the state of Minnesota, United States

- Location within Minnesota
- Location: Rice County, Minnesota
- Coordinates: 44°22′23″N 93°23′52″W
- Type: lake

Mazaska Lake is a lake in Rice County, in the U.S. state of Minnesota.

Mazaska is a Dakota language word meaning "silver" or "money".
