= Shields Lake =

Lake in the state of Minnesota, United States

- Location within Minnesota
- Location: Rice County, Minnesota
- Coordinates: 44°22′12″N 93°26′29″W
- Type: lake

Shields Lake is a lake in Rice County, in the U.S. state of Minnesota.

Shields Lake was named for James Shields (1810–1879), an American politician and U.S. Army officer.
