= Morristown Township, Rice County, Minnesota =

Morristown Township, Minnesota
- Township
- Location within the state of Minnesota Morristown Township, Minnesota (the United States)
- Coordinates: 44°14′50″N 93°28′30″W
- Country: United States
- State: Minnesota
- County: Rice

Area
  - Total: 35.1 sq mi (90.9 km^{2})
  - Land: 33.5 sq mi (86.8 km^{2})
  - Water: 1.6 sq mi (4.1 km^{2})
- Elevation: 1,043 ft (318 m)

Population (2000)
  - Total: 665
  - Density: 20/sq mi (7.7/km^{2})
- Time zone: UTC-6 (Central (CST))
  - Summer (DST): UTC-5 (CDT)
- ZIP code: 55052
- Area code: 507
- FIPS code: 27-44314
- GNIS feature ID: 0665041

Morristown Township is a township in Rice County, Minnesota, United States. The population was 665 at the 2000 census.

Morristown is located within Morristown Township geographically but is a separate entity.

Morristown Township was organized in 1858, and named for Jonathan Morris, a pioneer settler.

== Geography ==
According to the United States Census Bureau, the township has a total area of 35.1 square miles (90.9 km^{2}), of which 33.5 square miles (86.8 km^{2}) is land and 1.6 square miles (4.1 km^{2}) (4.50%) is water.

== Demographics ==
As of the census of 2000, there were 665 people, 240 households, and 191 families residing in the township. The population density was 19.8 inhabitants per square mile (7.6/km^{2}). There were 259 housing units at an average density of 7.7 per square mile (3.0/km^{2}). The racial makeup of the township was 99.85% White, and 0.15% from two or more races. Hispanic or Latino of any race were 0.45% of the population.

There were 240 households, out of which 35.8% had children under the age of 18 living with them, 73.3% were married couples living together, 2.9% had a female householder with no husband present, and 20.4% were non-families. 18.3% of all households were made up of individuals, and 8.3% had someone living alone who was 65 years of age or older. The average household size was 2.77 and the average family size was 3.17.

In the township the population was spread out, with 26.8% under the age of 18, 6.0% from 18 to 24, 26.9% from 25 to 44, 25.3% from 45 to 64, and 15.0% who were 65 years of age or older. The median age was 40 years. For every 100 females, there were 103.4 males. For every 100 females age 18 and over, there were 102.1 males.

The median income for a household in the township was $51,932, and the median income for a family was $56,364. Males had a median income of $38,750 versus $24,722 for females. The per capita income for the township was $20,340. About 4.0% of families and 4.9% of the population were below the poverty line, including 2.6% of those under age 18 and 11.7% of those age 65 or over.
