= Northfield Township, Rice County, Minnesota =

Northfield Township, Minnesota
- Township
- Location within the state of Minnesota Northfield Township, Minnesota (the United States)
- Coordinates: 44°24′54″N 93°5′25″W
- Country: United States
- State: Minnesota
- County: Rice

Area
  - Total: 38.9 sq mi (100.8 km^{2})
  - Land: 38.9 sq mi (100.8 km^{2})
  - Water: 0 sq mi (0.0 km^{2})
- Elevation: 1,020 ft (310 m)

Population (2000)
  - Total: 780
  - Density: 20/sq mi (7.7/km^{2})
- Time zone: UTC-6 (Central (CST))
  - Summer (DST): UTC-5 (CDT)
- ZIP code: 55057
- Area code: 507
- FIPS code: 27-46942
- GNIS feature ID: 0665155
- Website: https://northfieldtwp.org/

Northfield Township is a township in Rice County, Minnesota, United States. The population was 780 at the 2000 census.

Northfield Township was organized in 1858, and named for John W. North.

== Geography ==
According to the United States Census Bureau, the township has a total area of 38.9 square miles (100.8 km^{2}), all land.

== Demographics ==
As of the census of 2000, there were 780 people, 257 households, and 219 families residing in the township. The population density was 20.0 people per square mile (7.7/km^{2}). There were 264 housing units at an average density of 6.8/sq mi (2.6/km^{2}). The racial makeup of the township was 98.59% White, 0.26% Native American, 0.51% Asian, 0.38% from other races, and 0.26% from two or more races. Hispanic or Latino of any race were 0.90% of the population.

There were 257 households, out of which 43.2% had children under the age of 18 living with them, 78.6% were married couples living together, 2.3% had a female householder with no husband present, and 14.4% were non-families. 9.3% of all households were made up of individuals, and 4.7% had someone living alone who was 65 years of age or older. The average household size was 3.04 and the average family size was 3.25.

In the township the population was spread out, with 30.3% under the age of 18, 7.4% from 18 to 24, 26.7% from 25 to 44, 26.0% from 45 to 64, and 9.6% who were 65 years of age or older. The median age was 38 years. For every 100 females, there were 97.0 males. For every 100 females age 18 and over, there were 97.8 males.

The median income for a household in the township was $62,500, and the median income for a family was $66,042. Males had a median income of $43,375 versus $30,536 for females. The per capita income for the township was $23,650. About 0.9% of families and 2.5% of the population were below the poverty line, including 1.6% of those under age 18 and 12.1% of those age 65 or over.
