= 1968 United States presidential election in Minnesota =

- November 5, 1968
- Turnout: 74.02% ▼

Nominee	Hubert Humphrey	Richard Nixon
Party	Democratic (DFL)	Republican
Home state	Minnesota	New York (Note: Although he was born in California and he served as a U.S. senator from California, in 1968 Richard Nixon's official state of residence was New York, because he moved there to practice law after his defeat in the 1962 California gubernatorial election. During his first term as president, Nixon re-established his residency in California. Consequently, most reliable reference books list Nixon's home state as New York in the 1968 election and his home state as California in the 1972 (and 1960) election.)
Running mate	Edmund Muskie	Spiro Agnew
Electoral vote	10	0
Popular vote	857,738	658,643
Percentage	54.00%	41.46%
County results
Humphrey
40–50%
50–60%
60–70%
70–80%
Nixon
40–50%
50–60%
60–70%
President before election
Lyndon B. Johnson
Democratic
Elected President
Richard Nixon
Republican

The 1968 United States presidential election in Minnesota took place on November 5, 1968, as part of the 1968 United States presidential election. Voters chose ten electors, or representatives to the Electoral College, who voted for president and vice president.

Minnesota was won by the Democratic Party candidate, incumbent Vice President Hubert Humphrey, the home-state favorite, won the state over former Vice President Richard Nixon by 199,095 votes, giving him one of his fourteen victories in the election (13 states plus D.C.).

The American candidate, former Alabama governor George Wallace, failed to make a substantial impact in Minnesota, as his base of support was primarily in the Deep South. While Wallace took 13.5% of the national popular vote and won five states of the former Confederacy, he only took 4.43% of the vote in Minnesota, his weakest state in the Midwestern United States.

Nationally, Nixon won the election with 301 electoral votes, though he led Humphrey by less than a percent in the popular vote. The election permanently disrupted the New Deal Coalition, which had been dominant in presidential politics since 1932. This was the first election since 1916 in which Minnesota backed the losing candidate in a presidential election. Nixon would become the first Republican to win the White House without carrying Minnesota. Nixon also became the first Republican to win without carrying Mower County, which would be repeated by every subsequent Republican winner until Donald Trump in 2016.

Until 2016, this was the last presidential election in Minnesota where any county was won with over seventy percent of the popular vote. In 2016, Donald Trump carried Morrison County with 73% of the vote, and Todd County with 70.75% of the vote. In this case, Humphrey won the following counties over this threshold: Carlton County, Lake County, and Saint Louis County. It was not until 2020 that Democrats received over 70% of the vote in a Minnesota county again, namely Hennepin and Ramsey counties.

== Results ==
1968 United States presidential election in Minnesota
Party	Candidate	Votes	Percentage	Electoral votes
Democratic (DFL)	Hubert Humphrey	857,738	54.00%	10
Republican	Richard Nixon	658,643	41.46%	0
American	George Wallace	68,931	4.43%	0
Peace and Freedom	Eldridge Cleaver	935	0.06%	0
Socialist Workers	Fred Halstead	808	0.05%	0
No party	Eugene McCarthy (write-in)	585	0.04%	0
Communist	Charlene Mitchell	415	0.03%	0
Socialist Labor	Henning Blomen	285	0.02%	0
Write-ins	Write-ins	170	0.01%	0
Totals		1,599,655	100.00%	10
Voter turnout		74%		—

=== Results by county ===
County	Hubert Humphrey DFL		Richard Nixon Republican		George Wallace American		Various candidates Other parties		Margin		Total votes cast
County	#	%	#	%	#	%	#	%	#	%	Total votes cast
Aitkin	3,094	54.69%	2,254	39.84%	286	5.06%	23	0.41%	840	14.85%	5,657
Anoka	30,656	61.15%	16,358	32.63%	3,073	6.13%	47	0.09%	14,298	28.52%	50,134
Becker	4,875	47.81%	4,728	46.37%	568	5.57%	25	0.25%	147	1.44%	10,196
Beltrami	5,034	52.63%	3,912	40.90%	599	6.26%	20	0.21%	1,122	11.73%	9,565
Benton	4,022	50.17%	3,470	43.29%	514	6.41%	10	0.12%	552	6.88%	8,016
Big Stone	2,119	53.70%	1,645	41.69%	176	4.46%	6	0.15%	474	12.01%	3,946
Blue Earth	9,254	47.37%	9,571	48.99%	686	3.51%	26	0.13%	-317	-1.62%	19,537
Brown	4,585	37.13%	7,039	57.00%	703	5.69%	23	0.19%	-2,454	-19.87%	12,350
Carlton	8,538	71.04%	3,016	25.10%	444	3.69%	20	0.17%	5,522	45.94%	12,018
Carver	4,590	38.96%	6,649	56.44%	528	4.48%	13	0.11%	-2,059	-17.48%	11,780
Cass	3,569	44.89%	3,888	48.91%	486	6.11%	7	0.09%	-319	-4.02%	7,950
Chippewa	3,701	51.78%	3,195	44.70%	243	3.40%	8	0.11%	506	7.08%	7,147
Chisago	4,102	53.61%	3,053	39.90%	492	6.43%	4	0.05%	1,049	13.71%	7,651
Clay	7,987	48.23%	7,910	47.77%	640	3.86%	23	0.14%	77	0.46%	16,560
Clearwater	2,046	57.46%	1,284	36.06%	217	6.09%	14	0.39%	762	21.40%	3,561
Cook	777	44.94%	853	49.33%	96	5.55%	3	0.17%	-76	-4.39%	1,729
Cottonwood	3,046	41.21%	4,050	54.80%	293	3.96%	2	0.03%	-1,004	-13.59%	7,391
Crow Wing	7,411	50.09%	6,687	45.20%	672	4.54%	25	0.17%	724	4.89%	14,795
Dakota	28,416	56.94%	19,290	38.65%	2,142	4.29%	60	0.12%	9,126	18.29%	49,908
Dodge	2,437	42.69%	3,064	53.67%	201	3.52%	7	0.12%	-627	-10.98%	5,709
Douglas	4,826	44.52%	5,464	50.41%	536	4.95%	13	0.12%	-638	-5.89%	10,839
Faribault	4,335	41.75%	5,662	54.53%	379	3.65%	8	0.08%	-1,327	-12.78%	10,384
Fillmore	3,918	36.94%	6,257	58.99%	426	4.02%	6	0.06%	-2,339	-22.05%	10,607
Freeborn	8,671	52.35%	7,315	44.16%	558	3.37%	19	0.11%	1,356	8.19%	16,563
Goodhue	7,220	45.23%	8,283	51.89%	451	2.83%	10	0.06%	-1,063	-6.66%	15,964
Grant	1,982	48.40%	1,929	47.11%	179	4.37%	5	0.12%	53	1.29%	4,095
Hennepin	220,078	54.07%	170,002	41.77%	15,659	3.85%	1,285	0.32%	50,076	12.30%	407,024
Houston	2,703	35.19%	4,450	57.94%	521	6.78%	7	0.09%	-1,747	-22.75%	7,681
Hubbard	1,920	38.79%	2,720	54.95%	304	6.14%	6	0.12%	-800	-16.16%	4,950
Isanti	3,439	54.27%	2,429	38.33%	451	7.12%	18	0.28%	1,010	15.94%	6,337
Itasca	10,512	64.86%	4,898	30.22%	780	4.81%	16	0.10%	5,614	34.64%	16,206
Jackson	3,515	51.95%	2,886	42.65%	359	5.31%	6	0.09%	629	9.30%	6,766
Kanabec	2,154	50.71%	1,847	43.48%	240	5.65%	7	0.16%	307	7.23%	4,248
Kandiyohi	7,639	57.01%	5,086	37.96%	658	4.91%	17	0.13%	2,553	19.05%	13,400
Kittson	1,894	53.91%	1,436	40.88%	179	5.10%	4	0.11%	458	13.03%	3,513
Koochiching	4,697	66.01%	2,104	29.57%	299	4.20%	16	0.22%	2,593	36.44%	7,116
Lac qui Parle	2,937	50.39%	2,672	45.85%	212	3.64%	7	0.12%	265	4.54%	5,828
Lake	4,266	72.42%	1,351	22.93%	263	4.46%	11	0.19%	2,915	49.49%	5,891
Lake of the Woods	875	56.16%	607	38.96%	69	4.43%	7	0.45%	268	17.20%	1,558
Le Sueur	5,094	53.17%	4,189	43.72%	292	3.05%	6	0.06%	905	9.45%	9,581
Lincoln	2,109	52.33%	1,732	42.98%	187	4.64%	2	0.05%	377	9.35%	4,030
Lyon	5,317	53.35%	4,331	43.46%	306	3.07%	12	0.12%	986	9.89%	9,966
Mahnomen	1,508	57.89%	893	34.28%	201	7.72%	3	0.12%	615	23.61%	2,605
Marshall	3,161	53.07%	2,367	39.74%	418	7.02%	10	0.17%	794	13.33%	5,956
Martin	4,271	35.67%	7,115	59.43%	580	4.84%	7	0.06%	-2,844	-23.76%	11,973
McLeod	4,861	40.29%	6,619	54.87%	576	4.77%	8	0.07%	-1,758	-14.58%	12,064
Meeker	4,213	48.40%	4,044	46.46%	438	5.03%	9	0.10%	169	1.94%	8,704
Mille Lacs	3,494	50.71%	2,990	43.40%	399	5.79%	7	0.10%	504	7.31%	6,890
Morrison	6,111	54.29%	4,511	40.08%	612	5.44%	22	0.20%	1,600	14.21%	11,256
Mower	11,022	56.56%	7,736	39.70%	692	3.55%	36	0.18%	3,286	16.86%	19,486
Murray	2,662	45.21%	2,906	49.35%	316	5.37%	4	0.07%	-244	-4.14%	5,888
Nicollet	4,244	45.96%	4,671	50.58%	312	3.38%	7	0.08%	-427	-4.62%	9,234
Nobles	5,171	51.16%	4,451	44.04%	477	4.72%	8	0.08%	720	7.12%	10,107
Norman	2,828	56.42%	1,981	39.53%	200	3.99%	3	0.06%	847	16.89%	5,012
Olmsted	13,417	42.14%	17,292	54.31%	1,103	3.46%	28	0.09%	-3,875	-12.17%	31,840
Otter Tail	7,400	35.75%	12,483	60.30%	802	3.87%	16	0.08%	-5,083	-24.55%	20,701
Pennington	2,998	54.86%	2,247	41.12%	212	3.88%	8	0.15%	751	13.74%	5,465
Pine	4,044	56.82%	2,591	36.41%	463	6.51%	19	0.27%	1,453	20.41%	7,117
Pipestone	2,234	38.93%	3,241	56.48%	260	4.53%	3	0.05%	-1,007	-17.55%	5,738
Polk	8,380	55.24%	6,074	40.04%	700	4.61%	15	0.10%	2,306	15.20%	15,169
Pope	2,592	48.29%	2,504	46.65%	265	4.94%	7	0.13%	88	1.64%	5,368
Ramsey	122,568	62.64%	64,068	32.75%	8,543	4.37%	477	0.24%	58,500	29.89%	195,656
Red Lake	1,467	63.29%	718	30.97%	130	5.61%	3	0.13%	749	32.32%	2,318
Redwood	3,680	39.63%	5,134	55.29%	462	4.98%	9	0.10%	-1,454	-15.66%	9,285
Renville	4,535	45.78%	4,821	48.67%	543	5.48%	7	0.07%	-286	-2.89%	9,906
Rice	7,785	50.82%	7,037	45.94%	477	3.11%	20	0.13%	748	4.88%	15,319
Rock	2,084	38.78%	3,056	56.87%	232	4.32%	2	0.04%	-972	-18.09%	5,374
Roseau	2,649	52.61%	2,048	40.68%	326	6.47%	12	0.24%	601	11.93%	5,035
St. Louis	72,267	70.99%	25,981	25.52%	3,255	3.20%	294	0.29%	46,286	45.47%	101,797
Scott	6,656	56.23%	4,632	39.13%	540	4.56%	9	0.08%	2,024	17.10%	11,837
Sherburne	3,481	52.80%	2,737	41.51%	369	5.60%	6	0.09%	744	11.29%	6,593
Sibley	2,540	35.50%	4,250	59.41%	361	5.05%	3	0.04%	-1,710	-23.91%	7,154
Stearns	15,990	47.62%	15,422	45.93%	2,081	6.20%	87	0.26%	568	1.69%	33,580
Steele	4,631	41.39%	6,193	55.34%	358	3.20%	8	0.07%	-1,562	-13.95%	11,190
Stevens	2,247	44.39%	2,560	50.57%	246	4.86%	9	0.18%	-313	-6.18%	5,062
Swift	3,716	57.60%	2,476	38.38%	247	3.83%	12	0.19%	1,240	19.22%	6,451
Todd	3,992	42.20%	4,883	51.62%	572	6.05%	13	0.14%	-891	-9.42%	9,460
Traverse	1,669	54.12%	1,277	41.41%	137	4.44%	1	0.03%	392	12.71%	3,084
Wabasha	3,452	43.77%	4,081	51.75%	346	4.39%	7	0.09%	-629	-7.98%	7,886
Wadena	2,198	40.81%	2,912	54.07%	269	4.99%	7	0.13%	-714	-13.26%	5,386
Waseca	3,057	40.20%	4,292	56.44%	244	3.21%	12	0.16%	-1,235	-16.24%	7,605
Washington	16,449	56.81%	10,921	37.72%	1,527	5.27%	57	0.20%	5,528	19.09%	28,954
Watonwan	2,701	41.99%	3,446	53.57%	278	4.32%	8	0.12%	-745	-11.58%	6,433
Wilkin	1,946	46.72%	2,037	48.91%	181	4.35%	1	0.02%	-91	-2.19%	4,165
Winona	8,627	49.46%	7,998	45.85%	781	4.48%	37	0.21%	629	3.61%	17,443
Wright	8,793	55.82%	6,321	40.13%	627	3.98%	12	0.08%	2,472	15.69%	15,753
Yellow Medicine	3,587	50.81%	3,060	43.34%	406	5.75%	7	0.10%	527	7.47%	7,060
Totals	857,738	54.00%	658,643	41.46%	68,931	4.34%	3,198	0.20%	199,095	12.54%	1,588,510

==== Counties that flipped from Democratic to Republican ====
- Watonwan
- Todd
- Wilkin
- Faribault
- Douglas
- Fillmore
- Cottonwood
- Cook
- Pipestone
- Redwood
- Brown
- Blue Earth
- Goodhue
- Houston
- McLeod
- Murray
- Nicollet
- Olmsted
- Cass
- Renville
- Rock
- Steele
- Hubbard
- Stevens
- Wadena
- Wabasha
- Waseca

== See also ==
- United States presidential elections in Minnesota
