= 2016 United States presidential election in Minnesota =

- November 8, 2016
- Turnout: 74.72% (▼1.7 pp)
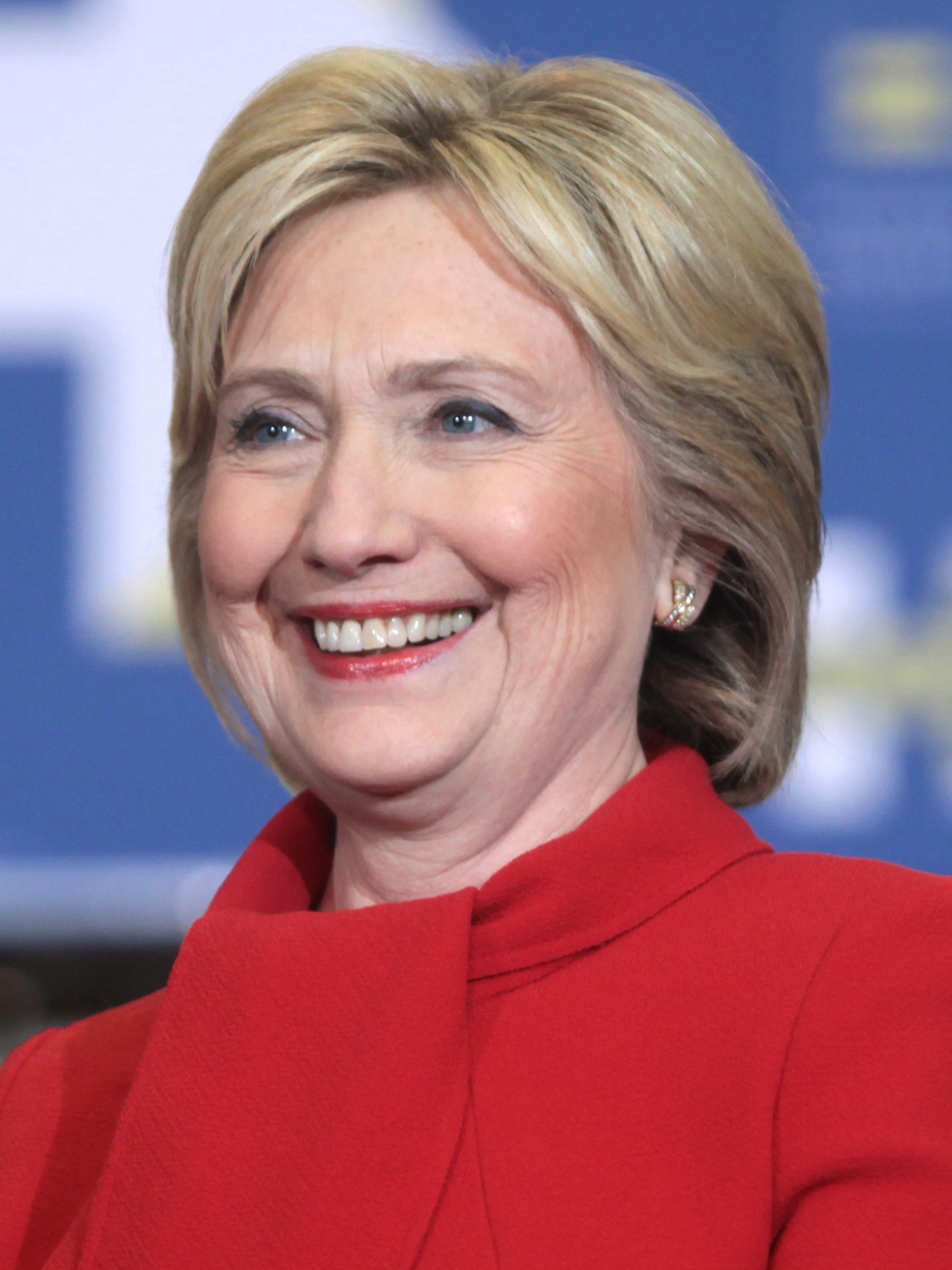

| Nominee | Hillary Clinton | Donald Trump |
| Party | Democratic (DFL) | Republican |
| Home state | New York | New York |
| Running mate | Tim Kaine | Mike Pence |
| Electoral vote | 10 | 0 |
| Popular vote | 1,367,825 | 1,322,951 |
| Percentage | 46.44% | 44.93% |

Clinton
30–40%
40–50%
50–60%
60–70%
70–80%
80–90%
90–100%
Trump
40–50%
50–60%
60–70%
70–80%
80–90%
90–100%
Johnson
90–100%
Tie/No Data
President before election
Barack Obama
Democratic (DFL)
Elected President
Donald Trump
Republican

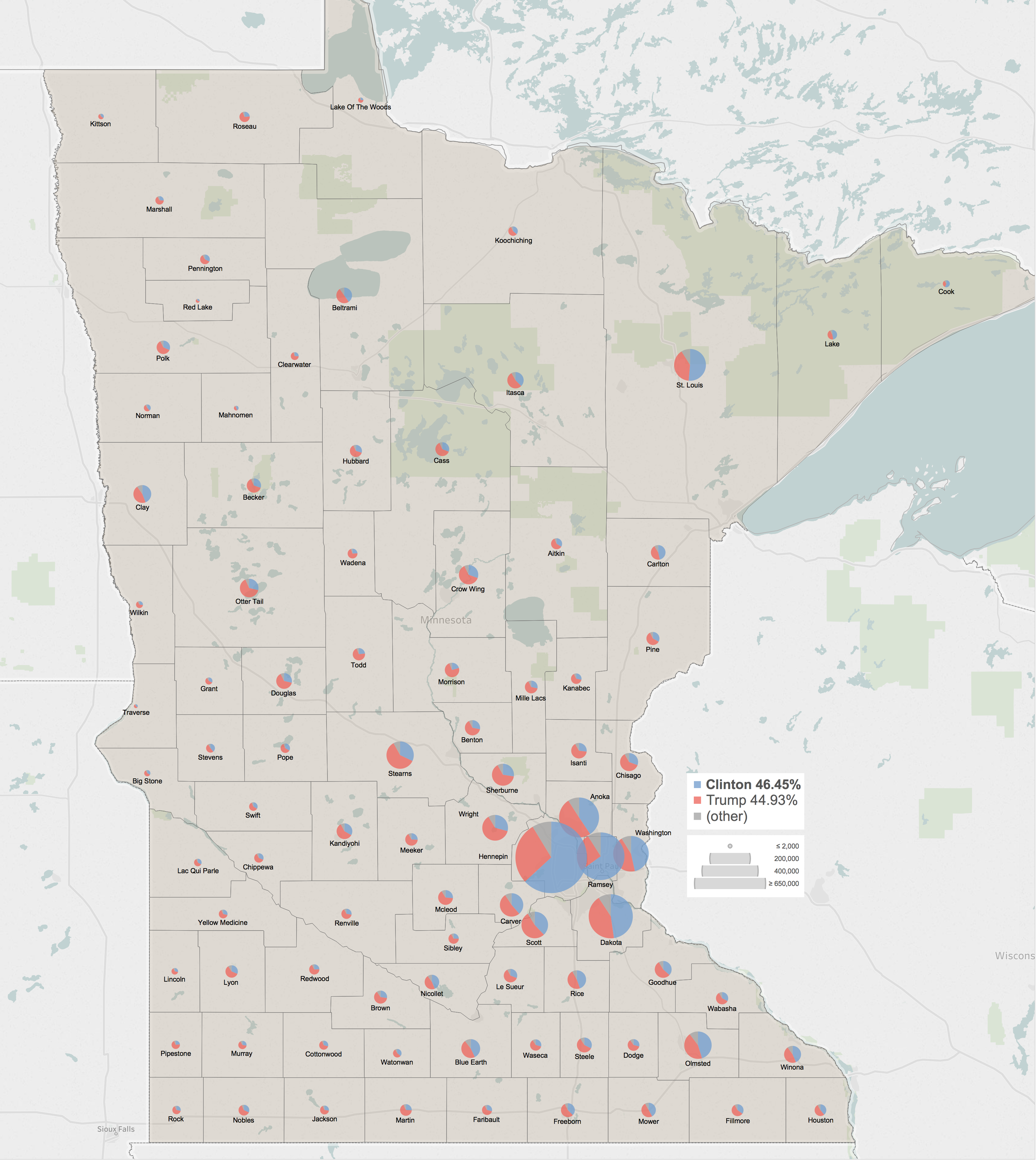
Results by county with size showing number of votes

Treemap of the popular vote by county

The 2016 United States presidential election in Minnesota was held on Tuesday, November 8, 2016, as part of the 2016 United States presidential election in which all 50 states and the District of Columbia participated. Minnesota voters chose electors to represent them in the Electoral College via a popular vote, pitting the Republican Party's nominee, businessman Donald Trump, and running mate Indiana Governor Mike Pence against DFL nominee, former Secretary of State Hillary Clinton, and her running mate Virginia Senator Tim Kaine. Minnesota has ten electoral votes in the Electoral College.

Despite Trump flipping numerous Midwestern states, some of which had not voted Republican since the 1980s, Minnesota was still won with a plurality by Clinton with a 1.51% margin, the eleventh consecutive Democratic presidential win in the state, which has not voted for a Republican since the landslide reelection of Richard Nixon in 1972. However, this was the closest presidential election in Minnesota since 1984, when Walter Mondale carried the state by a 0.18% margin and it was the only state not carried by Ronald Reagan that year; it is also the lowest winning percentage for any Democratic presidential candidate in any state since Bill Clinton in 1996 as well as the lowest winning percentage for any Democratic presidential candidate in Minnesota also since Bill Clinton in 1992.

Despite Trump falling short in Minnesota, Trump would become the first Republican since Dwight D. Eisenhower in 1952 to carry Swift County, a rural western Minnesota county. Trump would also flip Itasca County, making him the first Republican to carry the county nestled in the Iron range since Hoover in 1928. Trump, by far, has had the strongest performance of any Republican Presidential candidate in the Iron Range of North Eastern Minnesota, since Herbert Hoover won the region and the Counties of St. Louis, Lake, Itasca, and Carlton in 1928. Carlton County would break a 96-year streak of voting Democratic when Trump went on to flip the County in the 2024 Presidential election. Following the Presidential election of 1928, the Iron Range of Minnesota, particularly the east, would become one of the strongest Democratic strongholds in the U.S. for decades.

Minnesota had the highest voter turnout in the nation, with approximately 75% of the state's eligible voters participating in the general election. One elector, Muhammud Abdurrahan, tried to vote for Senator Bernie Sanders of Vermont but was replaced with an elector that voted for Clinton.

As of the 2024 election, this is the most recent election where Clay County voted Republican. This was the last time which any candidate won a majority of congressional districts in the state.

== Caucuses ==
=== Democratic caucuses ===
Bernie Sanders received the most votes and the most delegates in the precinct caucuses. The 2016 turnout was slightly lower than the 2008 tally of 214,066, when Obama won with 142,109 votes, to Clinton's 68,994. Bernie Sanders won every congressional district in Minnesota.

Minnesota Democratic caucuses, March 1, 2016
| Candidate | Popular vote | | Estimated delegates | | |
| Candidate | Count | Percentage | Pledged | Unpledged | Total |
|---|---|---|---|---|---|
| Bernie Sanders | 126,229 | 61.69% | 46 | 1 | 47 |
| Hillary Clinton | 78,381 | 38.31% | 31 | 13 | 44 |
| Uncommitted | —N/a | | 0 | 2 | 2 |
| Total | 204,610 | 100% | 77 | 16 | 93 |

=== Republican caucuses ===
The 38 delegates from Minnesota were allocated in this way. If a candidate received more than 85% of the vote, they would get all of 38 delegates. Otherwise, 24 delegates would be allocated proportionally based on the votes per congressional district (3 votes per district). On top of that, there were 10 at-large delegates and 3 party leaders (the National Committee Man, the National Committee woman, and the chairman of the Minnesota Republican Party). All of the at-large delegates were allocated proportionally based on the popular vote with a mandatory threshold of 10% to receive any delegates; if no one got at least 10%, all candidates would be eligible to get delegates.

2016 Minnesota Republican caucuses results
| Candidate | Votes | Percentage | Delegates |
|---|---|---|---|
| Marco Rubio | 41,397 | 36.24% | 17 |
| Ted Cruz | 33,181 | 29.04% | 13 |
| Donald Trump | 24,473 | 21.42% | 8 |
| Ben Carson | 8,422 | 7.37% | 0 |
| John Kasich | 6,565 | 5.75% | 0 |
| Write-ins | 207 | 0.18% | 0 |
| Total | 114,245 | 100.00% | 38 |
Source: Office of the Minnesota Secretary of State

Some media outlets recorded the votes by congressional district, rather than by county. Rubio won districts 1, 2, 3, 4 and 5 in the Minneapolis-Saint Paul area as well as the southern part of the state. Cruz won districts 6, 7 and 8 in the St. Cloud area and rural north.

=== Green caucuses ===
The Green Party of Minnesota held caucuses on March 1 in Saint Paul, Minneapolis, Bemidji, White Bear Lake, Blaine, Grand Rapids, and Willmar. Jill Stein won the caucuses with 84.3% of the vote. The delegates apportioned to each candidate will be decided at the state convention in St. Cloud, Minnesota in June. The results of the caucuses are as follows:

Minnesota Green Party presidential caucus, March 1, 2016
| Candidate | Votes | Percentage | National delegates |
|---|---|---|---|
| Jill Stein | - | 84.3% | 7 |
| Sedinam Moyowasifza-Curry | - | 5.9% | - |
| William Kreml | - | 4.8% | - |
| Darryl Cherney | - | 3.6% | - |
| Kent Mesplay | - | 1.2% | - |
| Total | - | 100.00% | 7 |

=== Libertarian caucuses ===
The Minnesota caucus was run on March 1, 2016, using ranked choice voting. Gary Johnson took over 75% of the 226 first-preference votes cast, with John McAfee a distant second on 11.5% and Austin Petersen third on 7.5%.

Minnesota Libertarian Party presidential caucus, March 1, 2016
| Candidate | Votes | Percentage |
|---|---|---|
| Gary Johnson | 171 | 75.66% |
| John McAfee | 26 | 11.50% |
| Austin Petersen | 17 | 7.52% |
| Darryl Perry | 4 | 1.77% |
| Cecil Ince | 2 | 0.88% |
| Steve Kerbel | 2 | 0.88% |
| None of the above | 2 | 0.88% |
| Marc Allan Feldman | 1 | 0.44% |
| Shawna Joy Sterling | 1 | 0.44% |
| Total | 226 | 100.00% |

=== Write-in ===
Many candidates had write-in status.

== General election ==
=== Predictions ===
| Source | Ranking | As of |
|---|---|---|
| Los Angeles Times | Likely D | November 6, 2016 |
| CNN | Safe D | November 4, 2016 |
| Cook Political Report | Likely D | November 7, 2016 |
| Electoral-vote.com | Lean D | November 8, 2016 |
| Rothenberg Political Report | Likely D | November 7, 2016 |
| Sabato's Crystal Ball | Likely D | November 7, 2016 |
| RealClearPolitics | Lean D | November 8, 2016 |
| Fox News | Lean D | November 7, 2016 |

=== Polling ===
Clinton won almost every pre-election poll in Minnesota by margins ranging from 5 to 11 points. Trump won one poll in November 2015, 45% to 42%, and one poll in September 2016 showed a tie. The average of the last two polls had Clinton up 50% to 41%. The last poll had Clinton up 53% to 42%.

=== Results ===
2016 United States presidential election in Minnesota
| Party | | Candidate | Running mate | Votes | Percentage | Electoral votes |
|---|---|---|---|---|---|---|
| | Democratic (DFL) | Hillary Clinton | Tim Kaine | 1,367,716 | 46.44% | 10 |
| | Republican | Donald Trump | Mike Pence | 1,322,951 | 44.92% | 0 |
| | Libertarian | Gary Johnson | William Weld | 112,972 | 3.84% | 0 |
| | Independence | Evan McMullin | Nathan Johnson | 53,076 | 1.80% | 0 |
| | Green | Jill Stein | Howie Hawkins | 36,985 | 1.26% | 0 |
| | Legal Marijuana Now | Dan Vacek | Mark Elworth, Jr. | 11,291 | 0.38% | 0 |
| | Constitution | Darrell Castle | Scott Bradley | 9,456 | 0.32% | 0 |
| | Socialist Workers | Alyson Kennedy | Osborne Hart | 1,672 | 0.06% | 0 |
| | American Delta | Rocky De La Fuente | Michael Steinberg | 1,431 | 0.05% | 0 |
| | Write-Ins | | | 27,263 | 0.93% | 0 |
| Total | | | | 2,944,813 | 100% | 10 |

==== By county ====
| County | Hillary Clinton DFL | | Donald Trump Republican | | Various candidates Other parties | | Margin | | Total votes cast |
| County | # | % | # | % | # | % | # | % | Total votes cast |
|---|---|---|---|---|---|---|---|---|---|
| Aitkin | 3,134 | 33.95% | 5,516 | 59.76% | 581 | 6.29% | -2,382 | -25.81% | 9,231 |
| Anoka | 75,500 | 40.64% | 93,339 | 50.25% | 16,919 | 9.11% | -17,839 | -9.61% | 185,758 |
| Becker | 5,208 | 30.24% | 10,880 | 63.18% | 1,134 | 6.58% | -5,672 | -32.94% | 17,222 |
| Beltrami | 8,688 | 40.29% | 10,783 | 50.00% | 2,093 | 9.71% | -2,095 | -9.71% | 21,564 |
| Benton | 5,640 | 28.12% | 12,872 | 64.17% | 1,546 | 7.71% | -7,232 | -36.05% | 20,058 |
| Big Stone | 921 | 33.43% | 1,608 | 58.37% | 226 | 8.20% | -687 | -24.94% | 2,755 |
| Blue Earth | 14,428 | 42.95% | 15,667 | 46.64% | 3,498 | 10.41% | -1,239 | -3.69% | 33,593 |
| Brown | 3,763 | 27.31% | 8,708 | 63.20% | 1,308 | 9.49% | -4,945 | -35.89% | 13,779 |
| Carlton | 8,460 | 46.46% | 8,160 | 44.81% | 1,591 | 8.73% | 300 | 1.65% | 18,211 |
| Carver | 21,508 | 38.62% | 29,056 | 52.17% | 5,132 | 9.21% | -7,548 | -13.55% | 55,696 |
| Cass | 4,949 | 30.93% | 9,982 | 62.39% | 1,068 | 6.68% | -5,033 | -31.46% | 15,999 |
| Chippewa | 1,978 | 31.79% | 3,764 | 60.50% | 480 | 7.71% | -1,786 | -28.71% | 6,222 |
| Chisago | 9,278 | 30.69% | 18,441 | 61.01% | 2,509 | 8.30% | -9,163 | -30.32% | 30,228 |
| Clay | 12,971 | 44.12% | 13,543 | 46.07% | 2,884 | 9.81% | -572 | -1.95% | 29,398 |
| Clearwater | 1,100 | 25.91% | 2,925 | 68.90% | 220 | 5.19% | -1,825 | -42.99% | 4,245 |
| Cook | 1,912 | 56.32% | 1,156 | 34.05% | 327 | 9.63% | 756 | 22.27% | 3,395 |
| Cottonwood | 1,678 | 29.33% | 3,679 | 64.31% | 364 | 6.36% | -2,001 | -34.98% | 5,721 |
| Crow Wing | 10,982 | 30.64% | 22,287 | 62.18% | 2,573 | 7.18% | -11,305 | -31.54% | 35,842 |
| Dakota | 110,592 | 47.70% | 99,864 | 43.07% | 21,404 | 9.23% | 10,728 | 4.63% | 231,860 |
| Dodge | 3,102 | 29.12% | 6,527 | 61.26% | 1,025 | 9.62% | -3,425 | -32.14% | 10,654 |
| Douglas | 6,227 | 28.58% | 13,966 | 64.11% | 1,592 | 7.31% | -7,739 | -35.53% | 21,785 |
| Faribault | 2,153 | 29.05% | 4,659 | 62.86% | 600 | 8.09% | -2,506 | -33.81% | 7,412 |
| Fillmore | 3,872 | 35.02% | 6,271 | 56.73% | 912 | 8.25% | -2,399 | -21.71% | 11,055 |
| Freeborn | 6,041 | 37.64% | 8,808 | 54.88% | 1,202 | 7.48% | -2,767 | -17.24% | 16,051 |
| Goodhue | 9,446 | 36.73% | 14,041 | 54.60% | 2,230 | 8.67% | -4,595 | -17.87% | 25,717 |
| Grant | 1,105 | 31.82% | 2,063 | 59.40% | 305 | 8.78% | -958 | -27.58% | 3,473 |
| Hennepin | 429,288 | 63.13% | 191,770 | 28.20% | 58,919 | 8.67% | 237,518 | 34.93% | 679,977 |
| Houston | 4,145 | 39.09% | 5,616 | 52.96% | 843 | 7.95% | -1,471 | -13.87% | 10,604 |
| Hubbard | 3,423 | 29.75% | 7,261 | 63.11% | 821 | 7.14% | -3,838 | -33.36% | 11,505 |
| Isanti | 5,657 | 26.92% | 13,635 | 64.88% | 1,724 | 8.20% | -7,978 | -37.96% | 21,016 |
| Itasca | 9,015 | 37.75% | 12,920 | 54.10% | 1,945 | 8.15% | -3,905 | -16.35% | 23,880 |
| Jackson | 1,492 | 27.21% | 3,609 | 65.81% | 383 | 6.98% | -2,117 | -38.60% | 5,484 |
| Kanabec | 2,327 | 28.46% | 5,230 | 63.96% | 620 | 7.58% | -2,903 | -35.50% | 8,177 |
| Kandiyohi | 7,266 | 33.37% | 12,785 | 58.72% | 1,721 | 7.91% | -5,519 | -25.35% | 21,772 |
| Kittson | 823 | 34.51% | 1,349 | 56.56% | 213 | 8.93% | -526 | -22.05% | 2,385 |
| Koochiching | 2,306 | 36.24% | 3,569 | 56.09% | 488 | 7.67% | -1,263 | -19.85% | 6,363 |
| Lac Qui Parle | 1,305 | 33.81% | 2,293 | 59.40% | 262 | 6.79% | -988 | -25.59% | 3,860 |
| Lake | 3,077 | 47.19% | 2,932 | 44.96% | 512 | 7.85% | 145 | 2.23% | 6,521 |
| Lake of the Woods | 553 | 24.67% | 1,540 | 68.69% | 149 | 6.64% | -987 | -44.02% | 2,242 |
| Le Sueur | 4,623 | 30.88% | 9,182 | 61.33% | 1,166 | 7.79% | -4,559 | -30.45% | 14,971 |
| Lincoln | 860 | 28.49% | 1,931 | 63.96% | 228 | 7.55% | -1,071 | -35.47% | 3,019 |
| Lyon | 3,825 | 31.31% | 7,256 | 59.40% | 1,134 | 9.29% | -3,431 | -28.09% | 12,215 |
| McLeod | 4,978 | 26.47% | 12,155 | 64.63% | 1,674 | 8.90% | -7,177 | -38.16% | 18,807 |
| Mahnomen | 930 | 44.54% | 991 | 47.46% | 167 | 8.00% | -61 | -2.92% | 2,088 |
| Marshall | 1,225 | 25.43% | 3,208 | 66.60% | 384 | 7.97% | -1,983 | -41.17% | 4,817 |
| Martin | 2,733 | 25.95% | 7,062 | 67.06% | 736 | 6.99% | -4,329 | -41.11% | 10,531 |
| Meeker | 3,191 | 25.98% | 8,104 | 65.98% | 987 | 8.04% | -4,913 | -40.00% | 12,282 |
| Mille Lacs | 3,710 | 28.50% | 8,340 | 64.07% | 967 | 7.43% | -4,630 | -35.57% | 13,017 |
| Morrison | 3,637 | 20.65% | 12,925 | 73.38% | 1,052 | 5.97% | -9,288 | -52.73% | 17,614 |
| Mower | 7,437 | 41.98% | 8,823 | 49.81% | 1,455 | 8.21% | -1,386 | -7.83% | 17,715 |
| Murray | 1,295 | 27.74% | 2,974 | 63.71% | 399 | 8.55% | -1,679 | -35.97% | 4,668 |
| Nicollet | 7,886 | 43.58% | 8,437 | 46.62% | 1,774 | 9.80% | -551 | -3.04% | 18,097 |
| Nobles | 2,733 | 31.66% | 5,299 | 61.39% | 600 | 6.95% | -2,566 | -29.73% | 8,632 |
| Norman | 1,264 | 38.76% | 1,699 | 52.10% | 298 | 9.14% | -435 | -13.34% | 3,261 |
| Olmsted | 36,268 | 45.26% | 35,668 | 44.51% | 8,193 | 10.23% | 600 | 0.75% | 80,129 |
| Otter Tail | 9,340 | 28.74% | 20,939 | 64.43% | 2,221 | 6.83% | -11,599 | -35.69% | 32,500 |
| Pennington | 2,147 | 31.97% | 4,000 | 59.57% | 568 | 8.46% | -1,853 | -27.60% | 6,715 |
| Pine | 4,580 | 33.16% | 8,191 | 59.31% | 1,040 | 7.53% | -3,611 | -26.15% | 13,811 |
| Pipestone | 1,127 | 23.44% | 3,338 | 69.43% | 343 | 7.13% | -2,211 | -45.99% | 4,808 |
| Polk | 4,712 | 31.85% | 8,979 | 60.69% | 1,105 | 7.46% | -4,267 | -28.84% | 14,796 |
| Pope | 2,106 | 33.33% | 3,793 | 60.03% | 420 | 6.64% | -1,687 | -26.70% | 6,319 |
| Ramsey | 177,738 | 65.07% | 70,894 | 25.95% | 24,511 | 8.98% | 106,844 | 39.12% | 273,143 |
| Red Lake | 540 | 28.71% | 1,141 | 60.66% | 200 | 10.63% | -601 | -31.95% | 1,881 |
| Redwood | 1,887 | 24.79% | 5,137 | 67.49% | 587 | 7.72% | -3,250 | -42.70% | 7,611 |
| Renville | 2,117 | 27.83% | 4,890 | 64.29% | 599 | 7.88% | -2,773 | -36.46% | 7,606 |
| Rice | 14,437 | 44.50% | 15,429 | 47.56% | 2,577 | 7.94% | -992 | -3.06% | 32,443 |
| Rock | 1,373 | 28.37% | 3,091 | 63.88% | 375 | 7.75% | -1,718 | -35.51% | 4,839 |
| Roseau | 1,856 | 23.78% | 5,451 | 69.85% | 497 | 6.37% | -3,595 | -46.07% | 7,804 |
| St. Louis | 57,771 | 51.39% | 44,630 | 39.70% | 10,021 | 8.91% | 13,141 | 11.69% | 112,422 |
| Scott | 28,502 | 37.99% | 39,948 | 53.24% | 6,579 | 8.77% | -11,446 | -15.25% | 75,029 |
| Sherburne | 13,293 | 27.53% | 31,053 | 64.31% | 3,937 | 8.16% | -17,760 | -36.78% | 48,283 |
| Sibley | 1,954 | 25.14% | 5,193 | 66.80% | 627 | 8.06% | -3,239 | -41.66% | 7,774 |
| Stearns | 25,576 | 32.13% | 47,617 | 59.83% | 6,399 | 8.04% | -22,041 | -27.70% | 79,592 |
| Steele | 6,241 | 32.54% | 11,198 | 58.39% | 1,740 | 9.07% | -4,957 | -25.85% | 19,179 |
| Stevens | 2,116 | 39.20% | 2,799 | 51.85% | 483 | 8.95% | -683 | -12.65% | 5,398 |
| Swift | 1,686 | 33.76% | 2,963 | 59.33% | 345 | 6.91% | -1,277 | -25.57% | 4,994 |
| Todd | 2,783 | 23.21% | 8,485 | 70.75% | 725 | 6.04% | -5,702 | -47.54% | 11,993 |
| Traverse | 630 | 35.04% | 1,049 | 58.34% | 119 | 6.62% | -419 | -23.30% | 1,798 |
| Wabasha | 3,866 | 32.67% | 6,989 | 59.07% | 977 | 8.26% | -3,123 | -26.40% | 11,832 |
| Wadena | 1,684 | 24.29% | 4,837 | 69.76% | 413 | 5.95% | -3,153 | -45.47% | 6,934 |
| Waseca | 2,838 | 29.40% | 5,967 | 61.81% | 848 | 8.79% | -3,129 | -32.41% | 9,653 |
| Washington | 67,086 | 46.51% | 64,428 | 44.67% | 12,721 | 8.82% | 2,658 | 1.84% | 144,235 |
| Watonwan | 1,814 | 36.29% | 2,768 | 55.38% | 416 | 8.33% | -954 | -19.09% | 4,998 |
| Wilkin | 893 | 27.04% | 2,129 | 64.48% | 280 | 8.48% | -1,236 | -37.44% | 3,302 |
| Winona | 11,366 | 43.59% | 12,122 | 46.49% | 2,586 | 9.92% | -756 | -2.90% | 26,074 |
| Wright | 20,334 | 29.21% | 43,274 | 62.16% | 6,010 | 8.63% | -22,940 | -32.95% | 69,618 |
| Yellow Medicine | 1,524 | 28.89% | 3,382 | 64.10% | 370 | 7.01% | -1,858 | -35.21% | 5,276 |
| Totals | 1,367,825 | 46.44% | 1,323,232 | 44.93% | 254,176 | 8.63% | 44,593 | 1.51% | 2,945,233 |

Counties that flipped from Democratic to Republican

- Beltrami (largest city: Bemidji)
- Blue Earth (largest city: Mankato)
- Chippewa (largest city: Montevideo)
- Clay (largest city: Moorhead)
- Fillmore (largest city: Spring Valley)
- Freeborn (largest city: Albert Lea)
- Houston (largest city: La Crescent)
- Itasca (largest city: Grand Rapids)
- Kittson (largest city: Hallock)
- Koochiching (largest city: International Falls)
- Lac qui Parle (largest city: Madison)
- Mahnomen (largest city: Mahnomen)
- Mower (largest city: Austin)
- Nicollet (largest city: North Mankato)
- Norman (largest city: Ada)
- Rice (largest city: Faribault)
- Swift (largest city: Benson)
- Traverse (largest city: Wheaton)
- Winona (largest city: Winona)

==== By congressional district ====
Despite losing the state, Trump won five of eight congressional districts, including three held by Democrats, while Clinton won the other three, including one held by a Republican.

| District | Clinton | Trump | Representative |
|---|---|---|---|
| 1st | 38% | 53% | Tim Walz |
| 2nd | 45% | 46% | Jason Lewis |
| 3rd | 50% | 41% | Erik Paulsen |
| 4th | 61% | 30% | Betty McCollum |
| 5th | 73% | 18% | Keith Ellison |
| 6th | 33% | 58% | Tom Emmer |
| 7th | 31% | 61% | Collin Peterson |
| 8th | 38% | 54% | Rick Nolan |

== Analysis ==
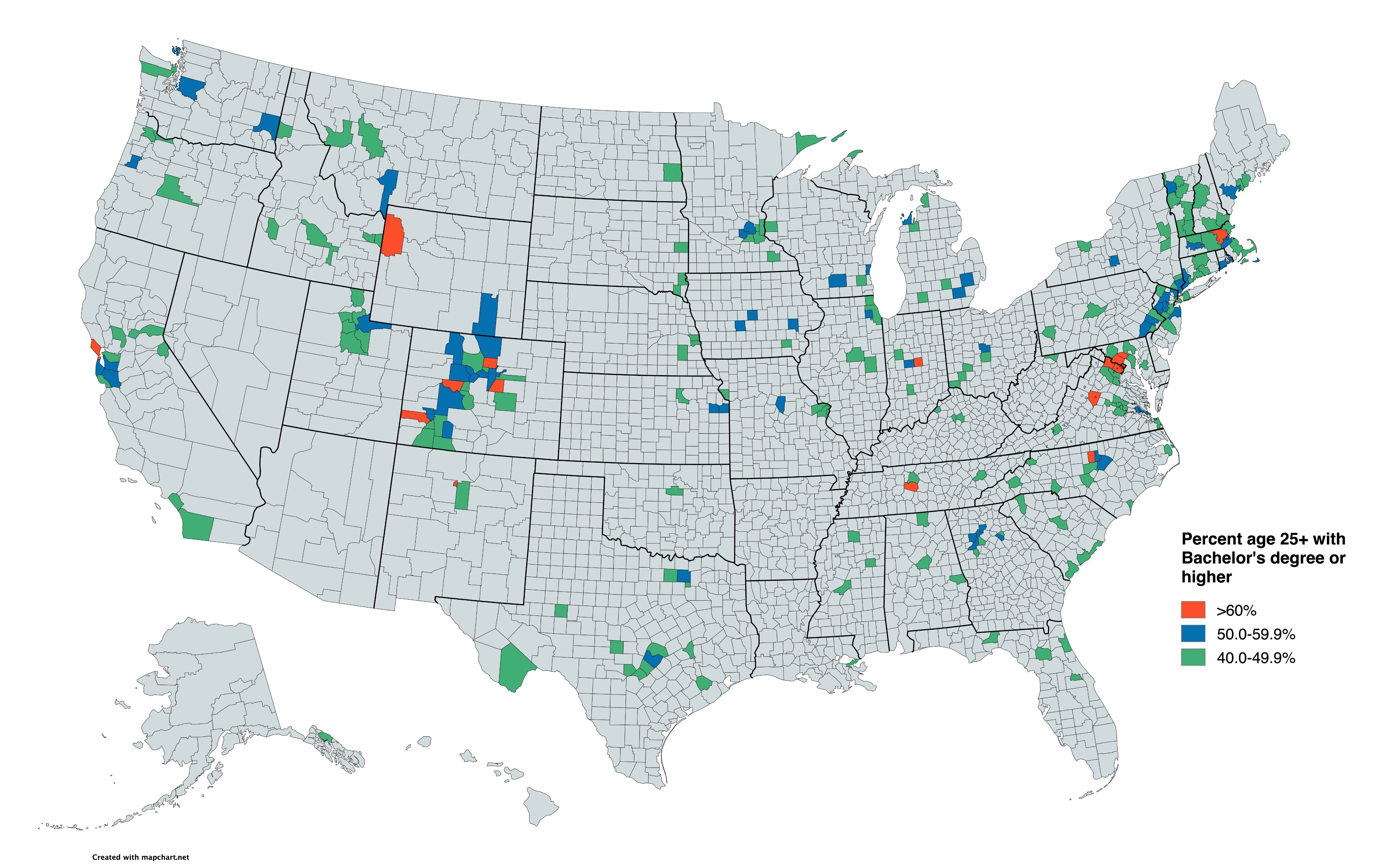
A map of the most college-educated counties in the United States

Minnesota voted 6.2 percent less Democratic from the 2012 presidential election, a much larger shift than the nation at large. Donald Trump only increased his vote tally compared to Mitt Romney in 2012 by 2,726 votes which resulted in a percentage of vote loss of 0.04%. The difference in Democratic voting was largely attributed to Independent or Write-In candidates. The most significant Independent gains went to Gary Johnson with 3.84 percent of the vote (+2.64% over 2012), Evan McMullin with 1.8 percent of the vote (he was not a candidate in 2012), and Jill Stein with 1.26 percent of the vote (+0.82% over 2012). These three candidates account for 5.26 percent of the swing. This election marked the first time since 1952 that the Democratic candidate performed worse in Minnesota than in the nation at large. Hillary Clinton won the national popular vote by 2.1 points but won Minnesota by just 1.5 points, or 44,593 votes. Minnesota has been a primarily Democratic state in national elections since 1932.

Due to Independent and Write-In gains throughout the state, Clinton was dependent on her wins in Hennepin (Minneapolis) and Ramsey (St. Paul) counties, the two most populous counties in the state, and the Arrowhead Region in the northeastern corner of the state. These counties are the most-educated in the state, as shown in the map, as Trump's gains were with white voters without college degrees.

Trump's votes came from less populated, rural counties. Two counties, Morrison and Todd, gave Trump over 70% of the vote, making this the first election since 1968 where either major party candidate won a county with over 70%, with Trump also being the first Republican to do so since Dwight D. Eisenhower in 1956.

Trump was also the first Republican to win Itasca County since Herbert Hoover in 1928, Swift County since Dwight D. Eisenhower in 1952, Mower County since Richard Nixon against John F. Kennedy in 1960, the first to win Fillmore and Winona counties since 1988, Rice County since 1972, Freeborn County since 1980, and Lac qui Parle County since 1984. Nonetheless, he became the first-ever Republican to win the White House without carrying Olmsted County.

== See also ==
- United States presidential elections in Minnesota
- 2016 Democratic Party presidential debates and forums
- 2016 Democratic Party presidential primaries
- 2016 Republican Party presidential debates and forums
- 2016 Republican Party presidential primaries
