= 1964 United States presidential election in Minnesota =

- November 3, 1964
- Turnout: 76.33% ▼

Nominee	Lyndon B. Johnson	Barry Goldwater
Party	Democratic (DFL)	Republican
Home state	Texas	Arizona
Running mate	Hubert Humphrey	William E. Miller
Electoral vote	10	0
Popular vote	991,117	559,624
Percentage	63.76%	36.02%
County results
Johnson
50–60%
60–70%
70–80%
Goldwater
50–60%
President before election
Lyndon B. Johnson
Democratic (DFL)
Elected President
Lyndon B. Johnson
Democratic (DFL)

The 1964 United States presidential election in Minnesota took place on November 3, 1964, as part of the 1964 United States presidential election. Voters chose ten electors, or representatives to the Electoral College, who voted for president and vice president.

Minnesota was won by the DFL candidate, incumbent President Lyndon B. Johnson, who had assumed the presidency less than a year earlier following the assassination of John F. Kennedy, won the state over U.S. Senator Barry Goldwater of Arizona by a margin of 431,493 votes, or 27.76%. Johnson went on to win the election nationally, by a landslide margin of 22.58% of the popular vote. Goldwater carried only six states, including his home state of Arizona, together with the five southern states of Alabama, Georgia, Louisiana, Mississippi, and South Carolina.

In the 1964 election, President Johnson carried Minnesota by a margin of victory that hadn't been seen in a presidential election in the state since Franklin D. Roosevelt carried the state by a margin of 30.83% over Alf Landon in 1936. This margin of victory was aided by the fact that Hubert Humphrey, the state's incumbent U.S. Senator, was on the Democratic ticket for vice president.

To date Johnson's performance is the best ever for a Democrat in Minnesota, in fact, no presidential candidate has since obtained more than 55% of the state's vote in a presidential election. Despite Johnson's emphatic win, as of the 2024 presidential election, this is the last election when Minnesota voted to the right of Alaska, Kentucky or Missouri, but also the last in which Brown County, Redwood County, and Rock County voted for a Democratic presidential candidate. Olmsted County would not vote Democratic again until 2008.

== Results ==
1964 United States presidential election in Minnesota
Party	Candidate	Votes	Percentage	Electoral votes
Democratic-Farmer-Labor	Lyndon B. Johnson (incumbent)	991,117	63.76%	10
Republican	Barry Goldwater	559,624	36.00%	0
Industrial Government	Eric Hass	2,544	0.16%	0
Socialist Workers	Clifton DeBerry	1,177	0.08%	0
Totals		1,554,462	100.00%	10
Voter turnout		76%		—

=== Results by county ===
County	Lyndon B. Johnson DFL		Barry Goldwater Republican		Eric Hass Industrial Government		Clifton DeBerry Socialist Workers		Margin		Total votes cast
County	#	%	#	%	#	%	#	%	#	%	Total votes cast
Aitkin	3,874	65.77%	2,000	33.96%	9	0.15%	7	0.12%	1,874	31.81%	5,890
Anoka	31,714	70.47%	13,201	29.33%	47	0.10%	43	0.10%	18,513	41.14%	45,005
Becker	6,453	63.14%	3,751	36.70%	6	0.06%	10	0.10%	2,702	26.44%	10,220
Beltrami	5,967	65.10%	3,184	34.74%	9	0.10%	6	0.07%	2,783	30.36%	9,166
Benton	4,679	62.22%	2,818	37.47%	20	0.27%	3	0.04%	1,861	24.75%	7,520
Big Stone	2,831	67.86%	1,331	31.90%	9	0.22%	1	0.02%	1,500	35.96%	4,172
Blue Earth	10,687	56.85%	8,009	42.61%	96	0.51%	5	0.03%	2,678	14.24%	18,797
Brown	6,069	50.84%	5,851	49.02%	10	0.08%	7	0.06%	218	1.82%	11,937
Carlton	9,552	77.29%	2,780	22.49%	13	0.11%	14	0.11%	6,772	54.80%	12,359
Carver	5,123	48.52%	5,424	51.37%	4	0.04%	7	0.07%	-301	-2.85%	10,558
Cass	4,635	59.78%	3,110	40.11%	7	0.09%	2	0.03%	1,525	19.67%	7,754
Chippewa	4,550	61.78%	2,806	38.10%	6	0.08%	3	0.04%	1,744	23.68%	7,365
Chisago	4,347	63.10%	2,525	36.65%	9	0.13%	8	0.12%	1,822	26.45%	6,889
Clay	10,161	62.39%	6,085	37.37%	35	0.21%	4	0.02%	4,076	25.02%	16,285
Clearwater	2,596	69.43%	1,137	30.41%	2	0.05%	4	0.11%	1,459	39.02%	3,739
Cook	976	56.03%	764	43.86%	2	0.11%	0	0.00%	212	12.17%	1,742
Cottonwood	4,090	54.33%	3,423	45.47%	9	0.12%	6	0.08%	667	8.86%	7,528
Crow Wing	9,197	64.10%	5,131	35.76%	9	0.06%	12	0.08%	4,066	28.34%	14,349
Dakota	28,391	67.07%	13,856	32.73%	64	0.15%	17	0.04%	14,535	34.34%	42,328
Dodge	3,138	55.84%	2,474	44.02%	6	0.11%	2	0.04%	664	11.82%	5,620
Douglas	6,040	59.36%	4,122	40.51%	8	0.08%	5	0.05%	1,918	18.85%	10,175
Faribault	5,946	55.18%	4,817	44.71%	8	0.07%	4	0.04%	1,129	10.47%	10,775
Fillmore	5,813	54.58%	4,824	45.29%	11	0.10%	3	0.03%	989	9.29%	10,651
Freeborn	10,554	63.16%	6,136	36.72%	16	0.10%	3	0.02%	4,418	26.44%	16,709
Goodhue	9,035	57.96%	6,539	41.95%	9	0.06%	6	0.04%	2,496	16.01%	15,589
Grant	2,631	60.26%	1,734	39.72%	1	0.02%	0	0.00%	897	20.54%	4,366
Hennepin	241,020	60.75%	154,736	39.00%	623	0.16%	348	0.09%	86,284	21.75%	396,727
Houston	3,885	53.03%	3,433	46.86%	7	0.10%	1	0.01%	452	6.17%	7,326
Hubbard	2,553	52.72%	2,283	47.14%	6	0.12%	1	0.02%	270	5.58%	4,843
Isanti	4,026	66.90%	1,982	32.93%	3	0.05%	7	0.12%	2,044	33.97%	6,018
Itasca	12,054	74.27%	4,137	25.49%	19	0.12%	21	0.13%	7,917	48.78%	16,231
Jackson	4,576	65.18%	2,441	34.77%	4	0.06%	0	0.00%	2,135	30.41%	7,021
Kanabec	2,666	66.25%	1,348	33.50%	5	0.12%	5	0.12%	1,318	32.75%	4,024
Kandiyohi	9,108	69.23%	4,011	30.49%	25	0.19%	12	0.09%	5,097	38.74%	13,156
Kittson	2,790	70.72%	1,153	29.23%	2	0.05%	0	0.00%	1,637	41.49%	3,945
Koochiching	5,878	78.47%	1,602	21.39%	6	0.08%	5	0.07%	4,276	57.08%	7,491
Lac qui Parle	3,934	63.66%	2,236	36.18%	5	0.08%	5	0.08%	1,698	27.48%	6,180
Lake	4,704	79.39%	1,205	20.34%	8	0.14%	8	0.14%	3,499	59.05%	5,925
Lake of the Woods	1,266	71.73%	489	27.71%	5	0.28%	5	0.28%	777	44.02%	1,765
Le Sueur	6,117	65.60%	3,191	34.22%	12	0.13%	5	0.05%	2,926	31.38%	9,325
Lincoln	3,024	68.29%	1,393	31.46%	2	0.05%	9	0.20%	1,631	36.83%	4,428
Lyon	6,649	67.69%	3,165	32.22%	7	0.07%	1	0.01%	3,484	35.47%	9,822
Mahnomen	1,967	75.11%	648	24.74%	3	0.11%	1	0.04%	1,319	50.37%	2,619
Marshall	4,594	70.79%	1,893	29.17%	2	0.03%	1	0.02%	2,701	41.62%	6,490
Martin	5,575	45.98%	6,529	53.84%	14	0.12%	8	0.07%	-954	-7.86%	12,126
McLeod	5,755	50.86%	5,545	49.00%	9	0.08%	7	0.06%	210	1.86%	11,316
Meeker	5,270	62.90%	3,099	36.99%	7	0.08%	2	0.02%	2,171	25.91%	8,378
Mille Lacs	4,369	63.58%	2,474	36.00%	15	0.22%	14	0.20%	1,895	27.58%	6,872
Morrison	7,492	67.91%	3,515	31.86%	16	0.15%	9	0.08%	3,977	36.05%	11,032
Mower	13,573	67.39%	6,510	32.32%	43	0.21%	14	0.07%	7,063	35.07%	20,140
Murray	3,822	62.13%	2,325	37.79%	5	0.08%	0	0.00%	1,497	24.34%	6,152
Nicollet	5,121	58.62%	3,605	41.27%	4	0.05%	6	0.07%	1,516	17.35%	8,736
Nobles	6,431	64.57%	3,517	35.31%	9	0.09%	3	0.03%	2,914	29.26%	9,960
Norman	3,631	68.50%	1,662	31.35%	5	0.09%	3	0.06%	1,969	37.15%	5,301
Olmsted	16,195	55.94%	12,699	43.87%	47	0.16%	9	0.03%	3,496	12.07%	28,950
Otter Tail	9,997	48.61%	10,542	51.26%	17	0.08%	9	0.04%	-545	-2.65%	20,565
Pennington	3,894	70.37%	1,630	29.45%	3	0.05%	7	0.13%	2,264	40.92%	5,534
Pine	5,123	69.04%	2,279	30.71%	10	0.13%	8	0.11%	2,844	38.33%	7,420
Pipestone	3,365	57.51%	2,481	42.40%	3	0.05%	2	0.03%	884	15.11%	5,851
Polk	11,052	68.60%	5,039	31.27%	11	0.07%	9	0.06%	6,013	37.33%	16,111
Pope	3,549	61.57%	2,213	38.39%	1	0.02%	1	0.02%	1,336	23.18%	5,764
Ramsey	133,948	69.91%	56,898	29.70%	579	0.30%	167	0.09%	77,050	40.21%	191,592
Red Lake	1,861	75.96%	573	23.39%	9	0.37%	7	0.29%	1,288	52.57%	2,450
Redwood	4,722	50.90%	4,546	49.00%	5	0.05%	4	0.04%	176	1.90%	9,277
Renville	6,072	58.18%	4,340	41.58%	14	0.13%	11	0.11%	1,732	16.60%	10,437
Rice	9,299	62.65%	5,518	37.18%	18	0.12%	8	0.05%	3,781	25.47%	14,843
Rock	2,896	54.78%	2,389	45.19%	2	0.04%	0	0.00%	507	9.59%	5,287
Roseau	3,636	68.69%	1,651	31.19%	3	0.06%	3	0.06%	1,985	37.50%	5,293
St. Louis	79,529	75.61%	25,246	24.00%	275	0.26%	133	0.13%	54,283	51.61%	105,183
Scott	7,248	68.57%	3,311	31.32%	9	0.09%	2	0.02%	3,937	37.25%	10,570
Sherburne	3,787	63.75%	2,132	35.89%	17	0.29%	4	0.07%	1,655	27.86%	5,940
Sibley	3,577	48.10%	3,854	51.83%	3	0.04%	2	0.03%	-277	-3.73%	7,436
Stearns	19,063	59.26%	13,009	40.44%	58	0.18%	36	0.11%	6,054	18.82%	32,166
Steele	6,022	55.05%	4,882	44.63%	27	0.25%	8	0.07%	1,140	10.42%	10,939
Stevens	2,910	56.65%	2,220	43.22%	6	0.12%	1	0.02%	690	13.43%	5,137
Swift	4,380	67.14%	2,132	32.68%	6	0.09%	6	0.09%	2,248	34.46%	6,524
Todd	5,673	58.47%	4,006	41.29%	17	0.18%	6	0.06%	1,667	17.18%	9,702
Traverse	2,247	67.64%	1,073	32.30%	2	0.06%	0	0.00%	1,174	35.34%	3,322
Wabasha	4,367	58.20%	3,133	41.75%	3	0.04%	1	0.01%	1,234	16.45%	7,504
Wadena	2,908	54.52%	2,418	45.33%	7	0.13%	1	0.02%	490	9.19%	5,334
Waseca	3,633	50.34%	3,570	49.47%	10	0.14%	4	0.06%	63	0.87%	7,217
Washington	18,108	67.01%	8,850	32.75%	43	0.16%	21	0.08%	9,258	34.26%	27,022
Watonwan	3,615	56.09%	2,823	43.80%	5	0.08%	2	0.03%	792	12.29%	6,445
Wilkin	2,751	62.65%	1,636	37.26%	1	0.02%	3	0.07%	1,115	25.39%	4,391
Winona	11,397	64.14%	6,345	35.71%	21	0.12%	7	0.04%	5,052	28.43%	17,770
Wright	8,687	61.24%	5,476	38.60%	14	0.10%	8	0.06%	3,211	22.64%	14,185
Yellow Medicine	4,707	63.06%	2,751	36.86%	5	0.07%	1	0.01%	1,956	26.20%	7,464
Totals	991,117	63.76%	559,624	36.00%	2,544	0.16%	1,177	0.08%	431,493	27.76%	1,554,462

==== Counties that flipped from Republican to Democratic ====
- Aitkin
- Blue Earth
- Brown
- Cass
- Chippewa
- Clay
- Chisago
- Crow Wing
- Cook
- Cottonwood
- Dodge
- Douglas
- Faribault
- Fillmore
- Freeborn
- Goodhue
- Hennepin
- Houston
- Hubbard
- Isanti
- Kandiyohi
- Kanabec
- McLeod
- Meeker
- Mille Lacs
- Mower
- Murray
- Micollet
- Nobles
- Olmsted
- Pipestone
- Pope
- Redwood
- Renville
- Rice
- Rock
- Sherburne
- Steele
- Stevens
- Todd
- Wabasha
- Wadena
- Waseca
- Watonwan
- Wilkin
- Winona
- Yellow Medicine
- Wright

== See also ==
- United States presidential elections in Minnesota
