= Roberds Lake =

Lake in the state of Minnesota, United States

- Location within Minnesota
- Location: Rice County, Minnesota
- Coordinates: 44°19′40″N 93°20′43″W
- Type: lake

Roberds Lake is a lake in Rice County, in the U.S. state of Minnesota.

Roberds Lake was named after William Roberds, who was told by other early settlers that if he swam across the lake, they would name it after them. He was also a pioneer who started a mill near the lake in 1855.
