= Rice County, Minnesota =

County in Minnesota, United States

- County
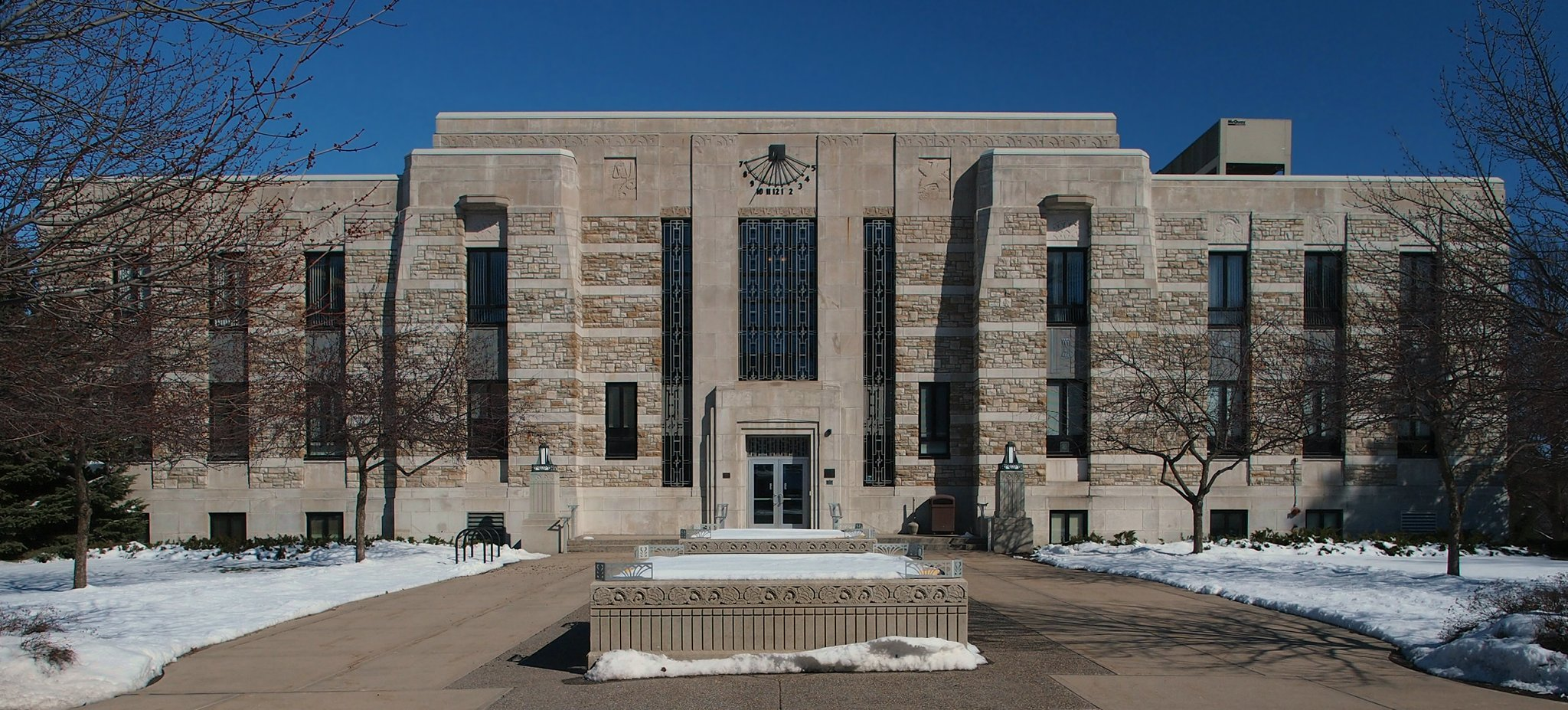
- Rice County Courthouse

- Location within the U.S. state of Minnesota
- Coordinates: 44°22′N 93°18′W
- Country: United States
- State: Minnesota
- Founded: March 5, 1853
- Named for: Henry Mower Rice
- Seat: Faribault
- Largest city: Faribault

Area
  - Total: 516 sq mi (1,340 km^{2})
  - Land: 496 sq mi (1,280 km^{2})
  - Water: 20 sq mi (52 km^{2}) 3.9%

Population (2020)
  - Total: 67,097
  - Estimate (2025): 69,939 ▲
  - Density: 135.3/sq mi (52.2/km^{2})
- Time zone: UTC−6 (Central)
  - Summer (DST): UTC−5 (CDT)
- Congressional districts: 1st, 2nd
- Website: www.ricecountymn.gov

Rice County is a county located in the south central portion of the U.S. state of Minnesota. As of the 2020 census, the population was 67,097. Its county seat is Faribault.

Rice County comprises the Faribault–Northfield, MN Micropolitan Statistical Area, which is included in the Minneapolis–St. Paul, MN-WI Combined Statistical Area.

== History ==
Rice County was founded on March 5, 1853. It was named for Henry Mower Rice, a fur trader who became instrumental in creation of the Minnesota Territory and its subsequent growth and development.

== Geography ==
The Cannon River flows northeasterly through the center of the county, on its way to discharge into the Mississippi River at Red Wing. The Straight River flows northerly into the county from Steele County to its discharge point into the Cannon River at Faribault. The North Fork of the Zumbro River rises in south-central Rice County, and flows eastward into Goodhue County on its way to discharge into the Mississippi east of Kellogg.

The county terrain consists of low, rolling hills, entirely devoted to agriculture, and dotted with lakes. The county slopes to the east and north; its highest point is near its SE corner, at 1,263 ft (385 m) ASL. The county has an area of 516 square miles (1,340 km^{2}), of which 496 square miles (1,280 km^{2}) is land and 20 square miles (52 km^{2}) (3.9%) is water. The Cannon River flows northeastwardly through the county, collecting the Straight River in Faribault. The North Fork of the Zumbro River has its headwaters in the county's southeastern part. Rice is one of 17 Minnesota savanna counties with more savanna soils than either prairie or forest soils.

Soils of Rice County

=== Major highways ===
- Interstate 35
- I-35 BL
- Minnesota State Highway 3
- Minnesota State Highway 13
- Minnesota State Highway 19
- Minnesota State Highway 21
- Minnesota State Highway 60
- Minnesota State Highway 99
- Minnesota State Highway 246
- Minnesota State Highway 298
- Minnesota State Highway 299

=== Adjacent counties ===
- Dakota County - northeast
- Goodhue County - east
- Dodge County - southeast
- Steele County - south
- Waseca County - southwest
- Le Sueur County - west
- Scott County - northwest

=== Protected areas ===
- Cannon Lake Wilderness Area
- Cannon River Trout Lily Scientific and Natural Area
- Faribault State Wildlife Management Area
- Nerstrand Big Woods State Park
- River Bend Nature Area
- Sakatah Lake State Park (part)
- Shager Park
- Townsend Woods Scientific and Natural Area
- Whitney Island Scientific and Natural Area

=== Lakes ===
- Cannon Lake
- Caron Lake
- Cedar Lake
- Circle Lake
- Crystal Lake
- Duban Lake
- Dudley Lake
- Fox Lake
- French Lake
- Hatch Lake
- Horseshoe Lake (part)
- Hunt Lake
- Kelly Lake
- Mazaska Lake
- Metogga Lake
- Mud Lake
- Phelps Lake
- Rice Lake
- Roberds Lake
- Sakatah Lake (part)
- Shields Lake
- Sprague Lake
- Union Lake
- Weinberger Lake
- Wells Lake
- Willing Lake

== Demographics ==
Historical population
Census	Pop.	Note	%±
1860	7,543		—
1870	16,083		113.2%
1880	22,481		39.8%
1890	23,968		6.6%
1900	26,080		8.8%
1910	25,911		−0.6%
1920	28,307		9.2%
1930	29,974		5.9%
1940	32,160		7.3%
1950	36,235		12.7%
1960	38,988		7.6%
1970	41,582		6.7%
1980	46,087		10.8%
1990	49,183		6.7%
2000	56,665		15.2%
2010	64,142		13.2%
2020	67,097		4.6%
2025 (est.)	69,939	▲	4.2%
U.S. Decennial Census; 1790-1960 1900-1990; 1990-2000 2010-2020

=== 2020 census ===
As of the 2020 census, the county had a population of 67,097. The median age was 37.4 years. 22.2% of residents were under the age of 18 and 16.4% of residents were 65 years of age or older. For every 100 females there were 101.8 males, and for every 100 females age 18 and over there were 101.1 males age 18 and over.

The racial makeup of the county was 78.4% White, 6.5% Black or African American, 0.7% American Indian and Alaska Native, 2.3% Asian, <0.1% Native Hawaiian and Pacific Islander, 5.7% from some other race, and 6.3% from two or more races. Hispanic or Latino residents of any race comprised 10.1% of the population.

67.8% of residents lived in urban areas, while 32.2% lived in rural areas.

There were 23,416 households in the county, of which 30.9% had children under the age of 18 living in them. Of all households, 52.1% were married-couple households, 17.2% were households with a male householder and no spouse or partner present, and 23.3% were households with a female householder and no spouse or partner present. About 26.3% of all households were made up of individuals and 11.9% had someone living alone who was 65 years of age or older.

There were 25,018 housing units, of which 6.4% were vacant. Among occupied housing units, 75.2% were owner-occupied and 24.8% were renter-occupied. The homeowner vacancy rate was 0.9% and the rental vacancy rate was 5.2%.

=== Racial and ethnic composition ===
Rice County, Minnesota – Racial and ethnic composition Note: the US Census treats Hispanic/Latino as an ethnic category. This table excludes Latinos from the racial categories and assigns them to a separate category. Hispanics/Latinos may be of any race.
Race / Ethnicity (NH = Non-Hispanic)	Pop 1980	Pop 1990	Pop 2000	Pop 2010	Pop 2020	% 1980	% 1990	% 2000	% 2010	% 2020
White alone (NH)	45,376	47,770	51,257	54,566	51,523	98.46%	97.13%	90.46%	85.07%	76.79%
Black or African American alone (NH)	117	166	713	2,021	4,353	0.25%	0.34%	1.26%	3.15%	6.49%
Native American or Alaska Native alone (NH)	62	108	182	247	297	0.13%	0.22%	0.32%	0.39%	0.44%
Asian alone (NH)	219	600	823	1,289	1,554	0.48%	1.22%	1.45%	2.01%	2.32%
Native Hawaiian or Pacific Islander alone (NH)	x	x	17	38	10	x	x	0.03%	0.06%	0.01%
Other race alone (NH)	88	9	63	57	425	0.19%	0.02%	0.11%	0.09%	0.63%
Mixed race or Multiracial (NH)	x	x	493	802	2,152	x	x	0.87%	1.25%	3.21%
Hispanic or Latino (any race)	225	530	3,117	5,122	6,783	0.49%	1.08%	5.50%	7.99%	10.11%
Total	46,087	49,183	56,665	64,142	67,097	100.00%	100.00%	100.00%	100.00%	100.00%

=== 2000 census ===
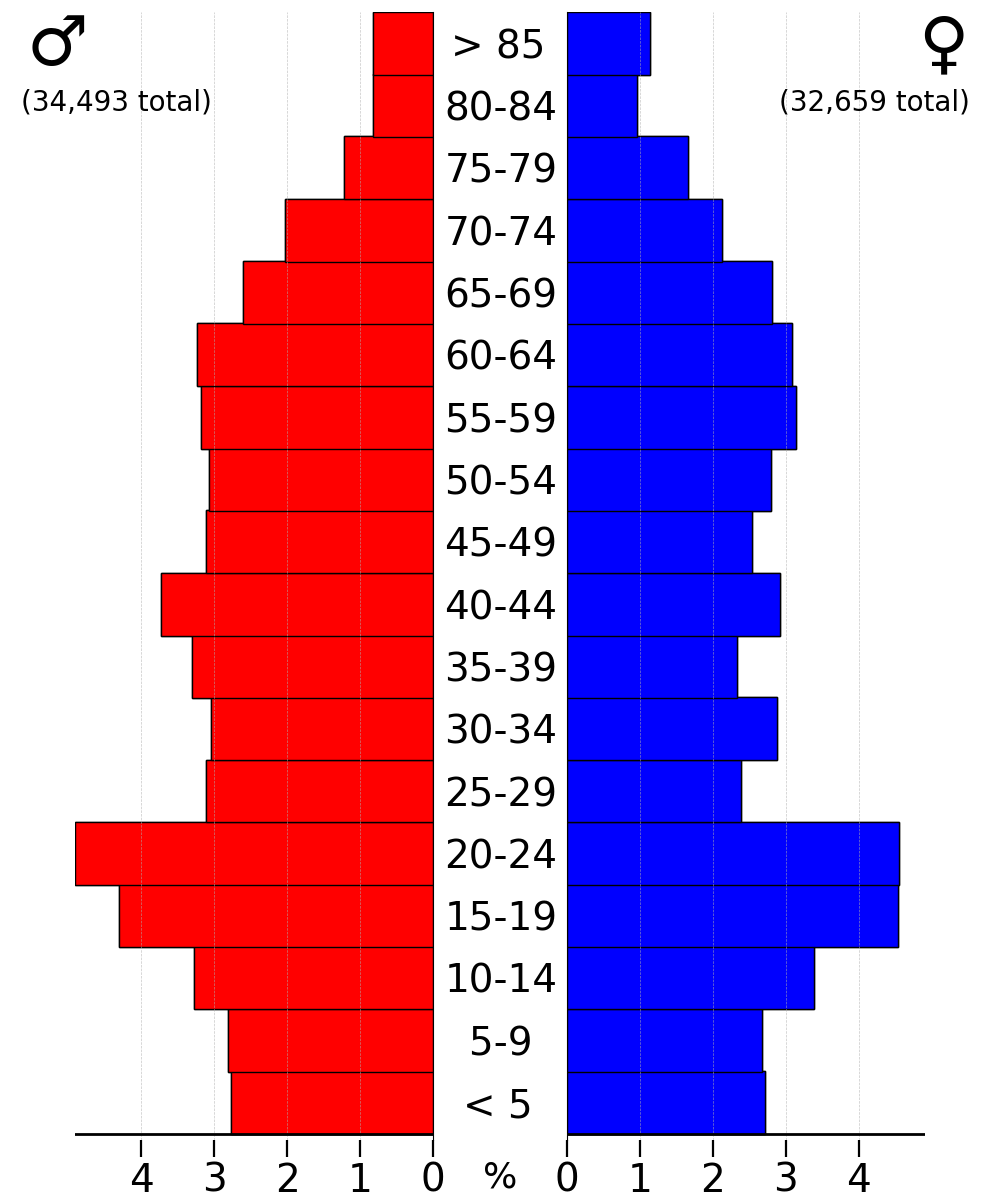
2022 US Census population pyramid for Rice County, from ACS 5-year estimates

As of the census of 2000, there were 56,665 people, 18,888 households, and 13,353 families in the county. The population density was 114 per square mile (44/km^{2}). There were 20,061 housing units at an average density of 40.4 per square mile (15.6/km^{2}). The racial makeup of the county was 93.59% White, 1.31% Black or African American, 0.43% Native American, 1.46% Asian, 0.04% Pacific Islander, 1.87% from other races, and 1.30% from two or more races. 5.50% of the population were Hispanic or Latino of any race. 32.1% were of German, 14.7% Norwegian, 7.2% Irish and 5.3% Czech ancestry.

There were 18,888 households, out of which 36.50% had children under the age of 18 living with them, 58.10% were married couples living together, 8.60% had a female householder with no husband present, and 29.30% were non-families. 23.90% of all households were made up of individuals, and 9.10% had someone living alone who was 65 years of age or older. The average household size was 2.65 and the average family size was 3.14.

The county population contained 25.30% under the age of 18, 15.80% from 18 to 24, 27.40% from 25 to 44, 20.20% from 45 to 64, and 11.40% who were 65 years of age or older. The median age was 33 years. For every 100 females there were 101.80 males. For every 100 females age 18 and over, there were 100.30 males.

The median income for a household in the county was $48,651, and the median income for a family was $56,407. Males had a median income of $36,771 versus $26,151 for females. The per capita income for the county was $19,695. About 4.00% of families and 6.90% of the population were below the poverty line, including 5.70% of those under age 18 and 10.70% of those age 65 or over.

== Parks and recreation ==
- Ackman Park 3 miles (4.8 km) west of Faribault
- Albers Park in Webster
- Cannon River Wilderness Area Park between Faribault and Cannon City
- Caron Park in Cannon City
- Circle Lake Park near Millersburg
- Falls Creek Park 1-mile (1.6 km) east of Faribault
- Heron Island in Shieldsville
- Hirdler Park 10 miles (16 km) west of Faribault
- King Mill Park in Faribault
- MccCullough Park and Campground Shields Lake

== Communities ==
=== Cities ===
- Dennison (partly in Goodhue County)
- Dundas
- Faribault (county seat)
- Lonsdale
- Morristown
- Nerstrand
- Northfield (partly in Dakota County)

=== Census-designated place ===
- Warsaw

=== Unincorporated communities ===
- Cannon City
- Epsom
- Hazelwood
- Little Chicago
- Millersburg
- Moland (partly in Steele County)
- Prairieville
- Ruskin
- Shieldsville
- Veseli
- Webster
- Wheatland

=== Townships ===
- Bridgewater Township
- Cannon City Township
- Erin Township
- Forest Township
- Morristown Township
- Northfield Township
- Richland Township
- Shieldsville Township
- Walcott Township
- Warsaw Township
- Webster Township
- Wells Township
- Wheatland Township
- Wheeling Township

== Politics ==
From its first participating election in 1860 through 1960, Rice County was traditionally Republican, voting for the Republican nominee in every election save 1912 (when it voted for Bull Moose nominee and former Republican president Theodore Roosevelt) and Franklin Roosevelt's 1932 and 1936 landslides. From 1964 through 2012, it became a Democratic stronghold, voting for the Democratic nominee in every election save Richard Nixon's 1972 landslide. In 2016, it voted for a Republican for the first time since 1972 (and for a Republican who was not winning a majority of the national popular vote for the first time since 1960), although it gave him only a plurality, with 7.9% voting third party. However, in 2020, with the third party vote sinking to 2.3%, it voted Republican again, making it the first time since 1956 and 1960 that the county has voted Republican two elections in a row (although the Republican margin was only 62 votes out of over 35,000 cast). In 2024, the county voted Republican for a third time, giving Donald Trump his first absolute majority of over 50% in the county out of all three elections he ran in.

United States presidential election results for Rice County, Minnesota
Year	Republican		Democratic		Third party(ies)	
Year	No.	%	No.	%	No.	%
1892	2,245	48.29%	1,794	38.59%	610	13.12%
1896	3,483	60.99%	2,002	35.06%	226	3.96%
1900	2,924	60.36%	1,688	34.85%	232	4.79%
1904	3,160	71.36%	1,063	24.01%	205	4.63%
1908	2,821	61.46%	1,614	35.16%	155	3.38%
1912	1,020	22.19%	1,613	35.09%	1,964	42.72%
1916	2,408	51.66%	2,083	44.69%	170	3.65%
1920	6,500	74.58%	2,040	23.41%	175	2.01%
1924	5,883	61.26%	1,199	12.49%	2,521	26.25%
1928	6,576	56.50%	5,014	43.08%	49	0.42%
1932	4,743	42.29%	6,289	56.08%	183	1.63%
1936	4,888	39.65%	5,928	48.09%	1,511	12.26%
1940	8,143	63.25%	4,687	36.40%	45	0.35%
1944	6,824	60.27%	4,470	39.48%	28	0.25%
1948	6,301	51.14%	5,832	47.33%	188	1.53%
1952	9,334	68.17%	4,330	31.62%	29	0.21%
1956	8,471	65.24%	4,489	34.57%	24	0.18%
1960	8,248	54.87%	6,752	44.92%	31	0.21%
1964	5,518	37.18%	9,299	62.65%	26	0.18%
1968	7,037	45.94%	7,785	50.82%	497	3.24%
1972	9,195	52.62%	8,065	46.15%	215	1.23%
1976	8,311	42.39%	10,590	54.01%	706	3.60%
1980	8,168	39.51%	9,531	46.10%	2,974	14.39%
1984	10,456	48.58%	10,880	50.55%	189	0.88%
1988	9,460	44.48%	11,570	54.40%	237	1.11%
1992	7,015	29.09%	10,908	45.24%	6,190	25.67%
1996	7,016	30.09%	12,821	54.98%	3,483	14.94%
2000	10,876	41.80%	13,140	50.50%	2,005	7.71%
2004	13,881	45.15%	16,425	53.42%	439	1.43%
2008	13,723	43.16%	17,381	54.66%	695	2.19%
2012	14,384	44.58%	17,054	52.85%	829	2.57%
2016	15,429	47.56%	14,437	44.50%	2,577	7.94%
2020	17,464	48.94%	17,402	48.76%	820	2.30%
2024	18,264	50.16%	17,353	47.66%	795	2.18%

County Board of Commissioners
Position	Name	District	Next Election
Commissioner	Jim Purfeerst	District 1	2024
Commissioner	Galen Malecha	District 2	2024
Commissioner	Gerry Hoisington	District 3	2026
Commissioner	Steve Underdahl	District 4	2026
Commissioner	Jeff Docken	District 5	2024

U.S Congress (2021-2023)
Position	Name	Affiliation	District
House of Representatives	Brad Finstad	Republican	1st
House of Representatives	Angie Craig	Democrat	2nd
Senate	Amy Klobuchar	Democrat	N/A
Senate	Tina Smith	Democrat	N/A

== Education ==
School districts include:

- Faribault Public Schools
- Kenyon-Wanamingo School District
- Medford Public School District
- New Prague Area Schools
- Northfield Public School District
- Tri-City United School District
- Waseca Public School District
- Waterville-Elysian-Morristown Public School District

State-operated schools include:

- Minnesota State Academy for the Blind
- Minnesota State Academy for the Deaf

Private schools:

- Shattuck-Saint Mary's School

Tertiary:

- South Central Community College

Library:

- Thomas Scott Buckham Memorial Library

== See also ==
- National Register of Historic Places listings in Rice County, Minnesota
