= Northfield Public Schools =

School district serving Northfield, Minnesota

Location
- Northfield, Minnesota United States

District information
- Type: Public School
- Grades: K-12
- Superintendent: Matt Hillmann, Ed.D.

Students and staff
- Students: 3,940
- Teachers: 325
- Staff: 631
- Athletic conference: Big 9 Conference
- Colors: Maroon, gold

Other information
- Website: Northfield School District

Northfield Public Schools (ISD 659) is a school district serving Northfield, Minnesota and surrounding areas. There are currently 3,940 students enrolled district-wide. Also, they are a Minnesota Department of Education approved charter school authorizer.

== Schools ==
=== High schools ===
- Northfield High School
- Area Learning Center (alternative high school)

=== Middle schools ===
- Northfield Middle School

=== Elementary schools ===
- Bridgewater Elementary
- Greenvale Elementary
- Spring Creek Elementary

=== Other ===
- Longfellow School (contains early childhood learning center, Area Learning Center)
