= Kong Kong (basketball) =

American basketball player (born 2000)

No. 14 – Windsor Express
- Position: Small forward
- League: Basketball Super League

Personal information
- Born: July 31, 2000 (age 26) Mankato, Minnesota, U.S.
- Listed height: 6 ft 6 in (1.98 m)
- Listed weight: 190 lb (86 kg)

Career information
- High school: Mankato East (Mankato, Minnesota)
- College: Rochester CTC (2018–2020); Emporia State (2020–2021); Kentucky State (2021–2023)
- NBA draft: 2023: undrafted
- Playing career: 2023–present

Career history
- 2023–2024: Oklahoma City Blue
- 2024–present: Windsor Express

Career highlights
- NBA G League champion (2024); First-team NJCAA D-III All-American (2020)

Kong Kong (born July 31, 2000) is an American professional basketball player for the Windsor Express of the Basketball Super League. He played college basketball for the Rochester Yellowjackets, Emporia State Hornets and the Kentucky State Thorobreds.

== High school career ==
Kong attended Mankato East at Mankato, Minnesota, averaging 8 points while his team went 25–7 his senior year.

== College career ==
Kong began playing college basketball at Rochester Community and Technical College, where he averaged 16.8 points, 10.8 rebounds and 1.8 blocks in 32 starts as a sophomore, helping the Yellowjackets to reach the NJCAA D-III National Semifinals, earning NJCAA D-III All-American in the process.

In 2020, Kong transferred to Emporia State, where he averaged 2.4 points, 1.1 rebounds and 1.3 assists in 21 games. The next year, he transferred to Kentucky State, where he averaged 10 points, five rebounds, and 1.6 assists as a senior while totalling 36 blocks and 24 steals.

== Professional career ==
=== Oklahoma City Blue (2023–2024) ===
After going undrafted in the 2023 NBA draft, Kong joined the Oklahoma City Blue on October 31, 2023, but was waived on November 6. On November 23, he re-signed with the Blue, but was waived on December 3. On January 26, he was re-signed only to be waived five days later. On February 12, he was back with Oklahoma City, but was waived again on February 27, only to be re-signed two days later. Throughout the year, he made 10 appearances while averaging 2.0 points, 0.8 rebounds and 0.6 assists in 9.5 minutes, winning the G League title with the Blue.

=== Windsor Express (2024–present) ===
On November 24, 2024, Kong signed with the Windsor Express of the Basketball Super League.

== Personal life ==
Kong has a mom and four brothers. He majored in business and accounting.
