= Setterstrom =

Setterstrom is a surname. Notable people with this surname include:

- Chad Setterstrom (born 1984), American football player
- Mark Setterstrom (born 1984), American football player
