= Big 9 Conference =

- Classification: MSHSL
- Founded: 1928
- No. of teams: 12
- Region: Minnesota

This is about a high school athletic conference in Minnesota. For the more well-known college sports conference that played under that name from 1899 to 1917 and from 1946 to 1949, see Big Ten Conference.

The Big 9 Conference was organized on April 28, 1928 at a meeting in Owatonna, Minnesota. The schools that associated themselves together "to promote athletic interests and good fellowship among the schools" were Albert Lea, Austin, Faribault, Owatonna, Mankato, Red Wing, Rochester, and Winona. It was then called the Big Eight.

== History ==
Until 1931 the Conference concerned itself only with athletics as that was the avowed purpose of its organization. In 1931 Superintendent Kirk of Faribault questioned the advisability of continuing the Conference, but on the motion of Rochester Superintendent Sanberg, it was decided to go ahead for another year with an expanded program which would include other matters of interest to the high schools than athletics. One year later the music supervisors and assistant coaches were invited to the meeting. As a result of this innovation the first Music Festival came into being and was held in the spring of 1933 in Austin. Since that time the Festival has been an annual affair with the exception of 1943, and is the oldest high school conference music festival in the country. The first Speech Festival was held in Rochester in the spring of 1940.

Owatonna, a prime mover in organizing, dropped out in 1934 because it did not choose to abide by round-robin schedules drawn up by the committee. Northfield filled the vacancy in the Big Eight, but in 1939 Owatonna rejoined the ranks making the Conference the Big Nine. Rochester Mayo became a member in the 1966-67 school year. Northfield withdrew from membership in 1968-69. Red Wing resigned as a member of the Conference effective in the fall of 1982. In 1986 Mankato East and Mankato West dropped out of football competition but rejoined in 1992. Rochester Century became a member of the Conference in the 1997-98 school year. Red Wing and Northfield re-joined during the 2014-2015 school year, bringing to the total number of schools to 12, though the conference name remains Big Nine.

== Current members ==
Institution	Location (Population)	Founded	Joined Big 9 Conference	Affiliation	Enrollment	Nickname	Color(s)
Albert Lea High School	Albert Lea, Minnesota (18,016)	1872	1928	Public	1239	Tigers	Blue and Red
Austin High School	Austin, Minnesota (24,718)	1869	1928	Public	1273	Packers	Scarlet and White
Faribault High School	Faribault, Minnesota (23,352)	1878	1928	Public	1055	Falcons	Green and White
Mankato East High School	Mankato, Minnesota; North Mankato, Minnesota (52,703)	1867/1973	1928 (as Mankato)	Public	1276	Cougars	Black and Gold
Mankato West High School	Mankato, Minnesota; North Mankato, Minnesota (52,703)	1867/1951	1928 (as Mankato)	Public	1,249	Scarlets	Scarlet and White
Northfield High School	Northfield, Minnesota (20,007)	1910	1934-1969 (rejoined in 2014)	Public	1,277	Raiders	Maroon and Gold
Owatonna Senior High School	Owatonna, Minnesota (25,599)	1877	1928-1934 (rejoined in 1939)	Public	1,501	Huskies	Royal Blue and Silver
Red Wing High School	Red Wing, Minnesota (16,459)	1875	1928-1981 (rejoined in 2014)	Public	1,124	Wingers	Purple and White
Century High School	Rochester, Minnesota (106,769)	1997	1928 (as Rochester)	Public	1,578	Panthers	Navy Blue and Silver
John Marshall High School	Rochester, Minnesota (106,769)	1958	1928 (as Rochester)	Public	1,573	Rockets	Red and Black
Mayo High School	Rochester, Minnesota (106,769)	1966	1928 (as Rochester)	Public	1,949	Spartans	Green and Gold
Winona High School	Winona, Minnesota (27,592)	1857	1928	Public	876	Winhawks	Orange and Black
