= St. Paul Union Pacific Rail Bridge =

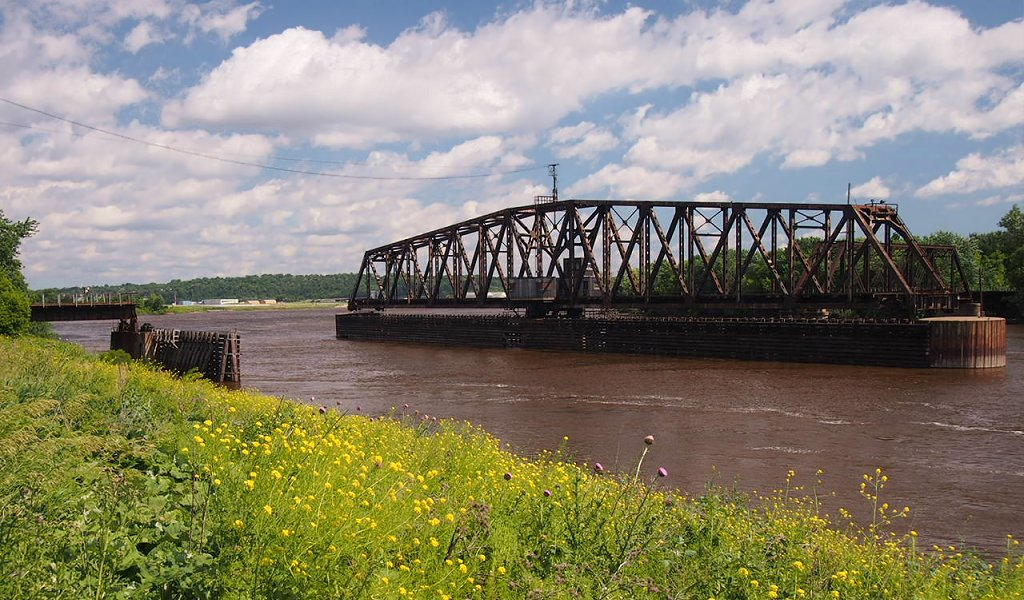
- The St. Paul Union Pacific Rail Bridge in open position
- Coordinates: 44°55′07″N 93°03′03″W
- Carries: Union Pacific Railroad
- Crosses: Mississippi River
- Locale: St. Paul, Minnesota
- Maintained by: Union Pacific Railroad
- ID number: K-526.82A

Characteristics
- Design: Swing bridge
- Total length: 1275 feet
- Width: 18 feet
- Longest span: 401 feet
- Clearance below: 20 feet

Rail characteristics
- No. of tracks: 1

History
- Opened: 1910

Statistics
- Daily traffic: 15.2 trains per day (as of 2014)

St. Paul Union Pacific Rail Bridge, also known as the Hoffman Swing Bridge, is a swing bridge that spans the Mississippi River between South Saint Paul, Minnesota and Saint Paul, Minnesota in the United States. It was built in 1910 by the St. Paul Bridge and Terminal Railway, and was rebuilt in 1925, after a flood in 1951, and again in 1982.

== History ==
The St. Paul Bridge and Terminal Railway was formed by the St. Paul Union Stockyard Company, which was controlled by Swift and Company, the meat-packing industry. The purpose of the railway was to switch freight from St. Paul into the stockyards in South St. Paul. The railway was leased to the Chicago Great Western Railway. The CGW was merged into the Chicago and North Western Railway system, along with the Chicago, Rock Island and Pacific Railroad. The Rock Island "Spine Line" and CGW line to Oelwein and Kansas City ran in parallel in South St. Paul. The Union Pacific Railroad purchased the assets of the C&NW.

== Present day usage ==
The current Union Pacific Railroad Albert Lea Subdivision from Des Moines, the former Rock Island "Spine Line", enters the Twin Cities area and terminates in a yard in South Saint Paul. From this area, traffic to downtown St. Paul takes two routes: one across this bridge, with yards on the east side of the river south of Dayton's Bluff; and the other route using the St. Paul Union Pacific Vertical-lift Rail Bridge into downtown St. Paul.

== Incidents ==
On October 26, 2017, a towboat struck a stationary bridge pier. The towboat was the "Cooperative Venture," owned by American River Transportation Company. It was moving several barges with dry goods but nothing was spilled. Repairs begin shortly afterward. Traffic was routed to the St. Paul Union Pacific Vertical-lift Rail Bridge and other locations.

On August 8, 2018, a train carrying oil across the bridge derailed, puncturing an oil tanker car and spilling 3,200 gallons of oil into the Mississippi River.

== See also ==
- List of crossings of the Upper Mississippi River

== Bibliography ==
- Costello, Mary Charlotte (2002). Climbing the Mississippi River Bridge by Bridge, Volume Two: Minnesota. Cambridge, MN: Adventure Publications. ISBN 0-9644518-2-4.
- Meyer, Dan. "Twin City Railfan's Guide".
