= Ames Mill Dam =

Coordinates: 44°27′22.9″N 93°09′41.4″W

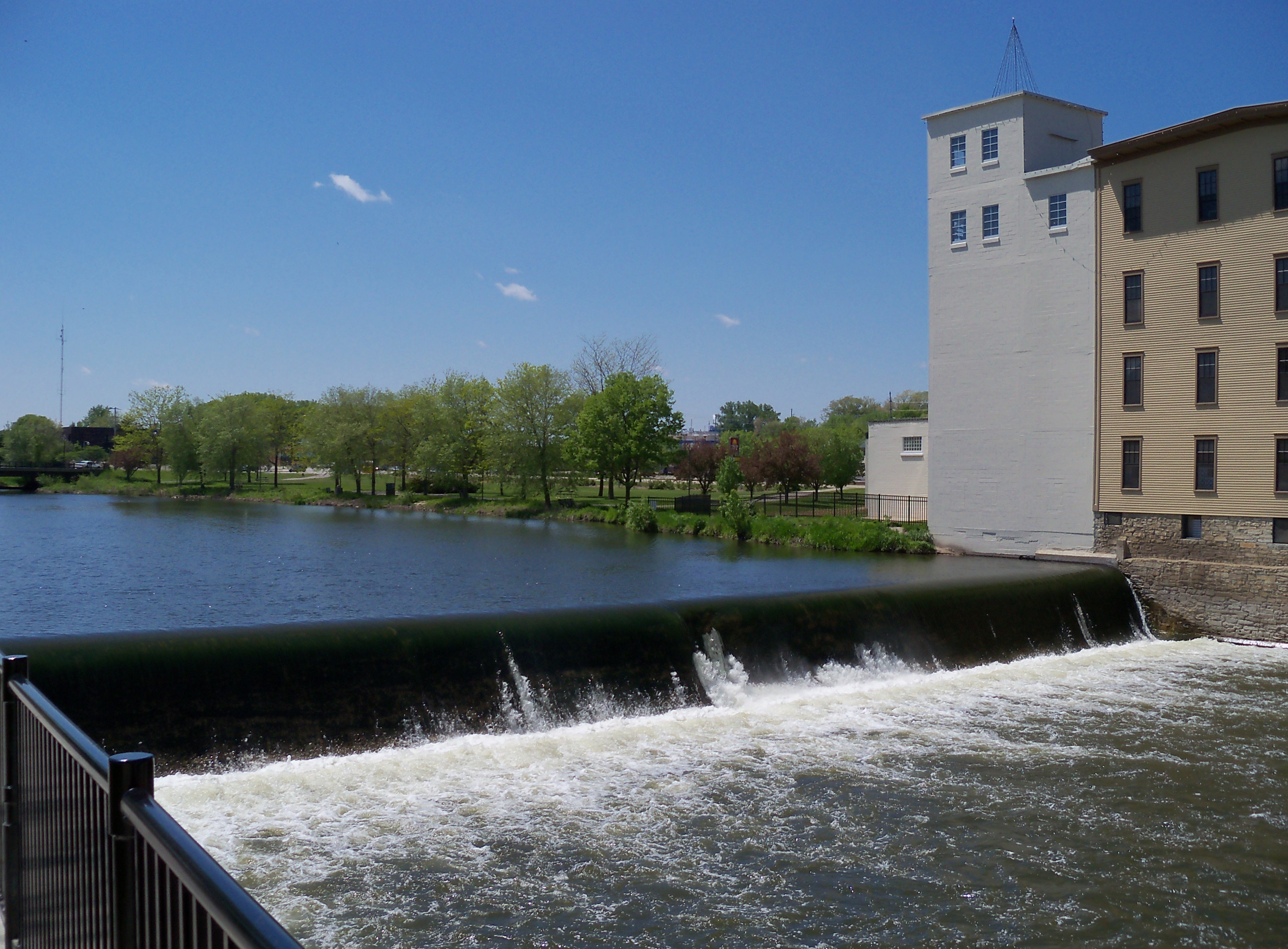
- Interactive map of Ames Mill Dam
- Country: United States
- Location: Northfield, Minnesota
- Status: Operational

Ames Mill Dam is a 6-foot (2 m) low-head dam located near South Water Street in Northfield city, in southeastern Minnesota, in the United States. It lies on the Cannon River, a tributary of the Mississippi River 35 miles (55 km) south of St. Paul. Ames Mill was originally built as a wooden dam in 1855 and then rebuilt as one of the six concrete dams on the Cannon River in 1919. The Cannon River was central to industrial development in the late 19th century through hydroelectric power production. The presence of dams along the river has influenced geomorphologic changes which affect fish, mussel populations and sediment. The Ames Mill Dam was used to power the Ames Flour Mill; however, it is no longer used for hydroelectric power because the dam is old and nearing the end of its lifespan. Currently the dam serves no functional purpose. The Cannon River is an essential part of Northfield's economic community and the Ames Mill Dam is a part of Northfield's historic identity. The dam is currently owned by Malt-O-Meal, a breakfast cereal company founded in 1919 and headquartered in Northfield, Minnesota.

== History ==
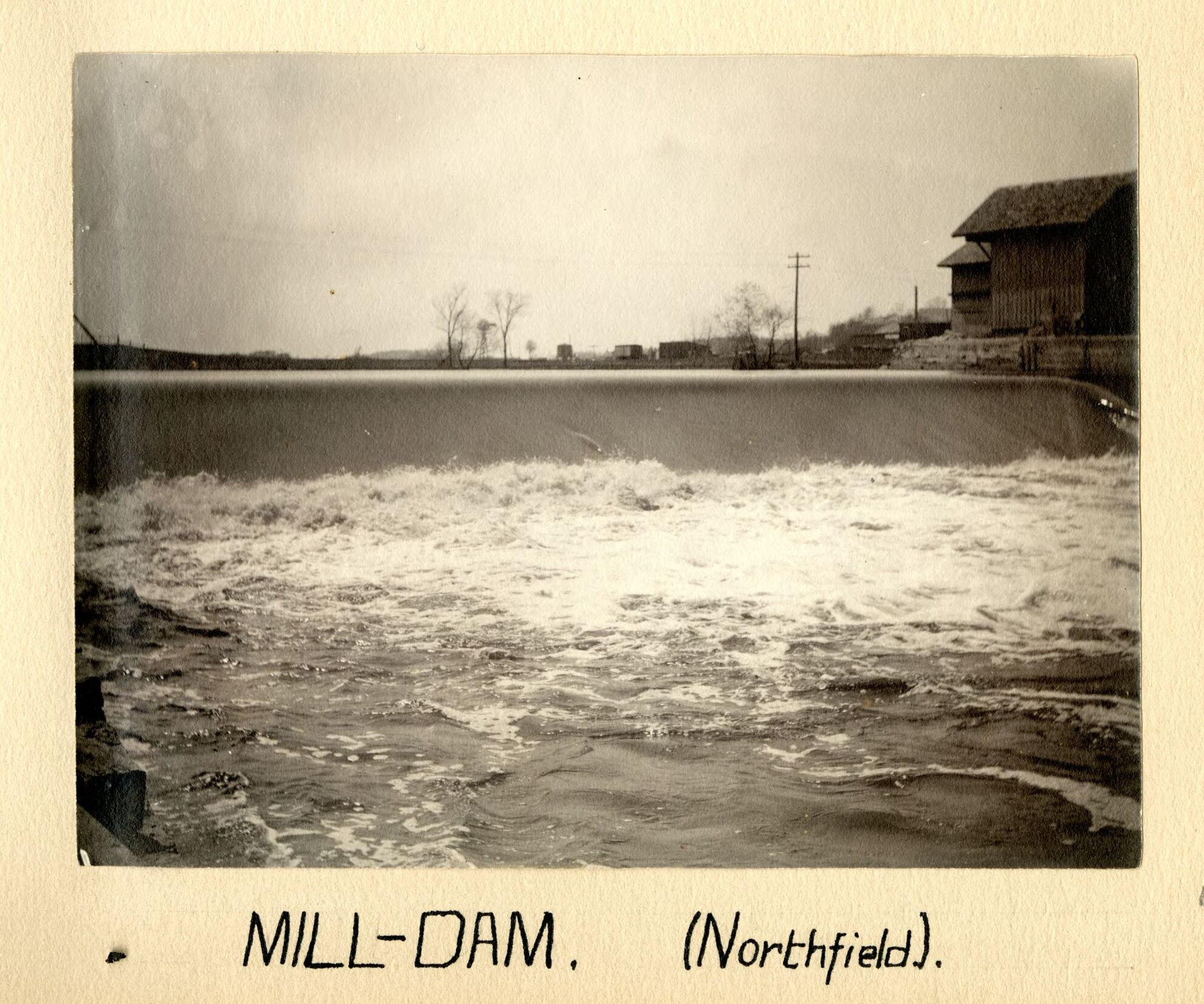
A close-up of Mill Dam, from Student photo album - Paul Barney, Carleton College class of 1895

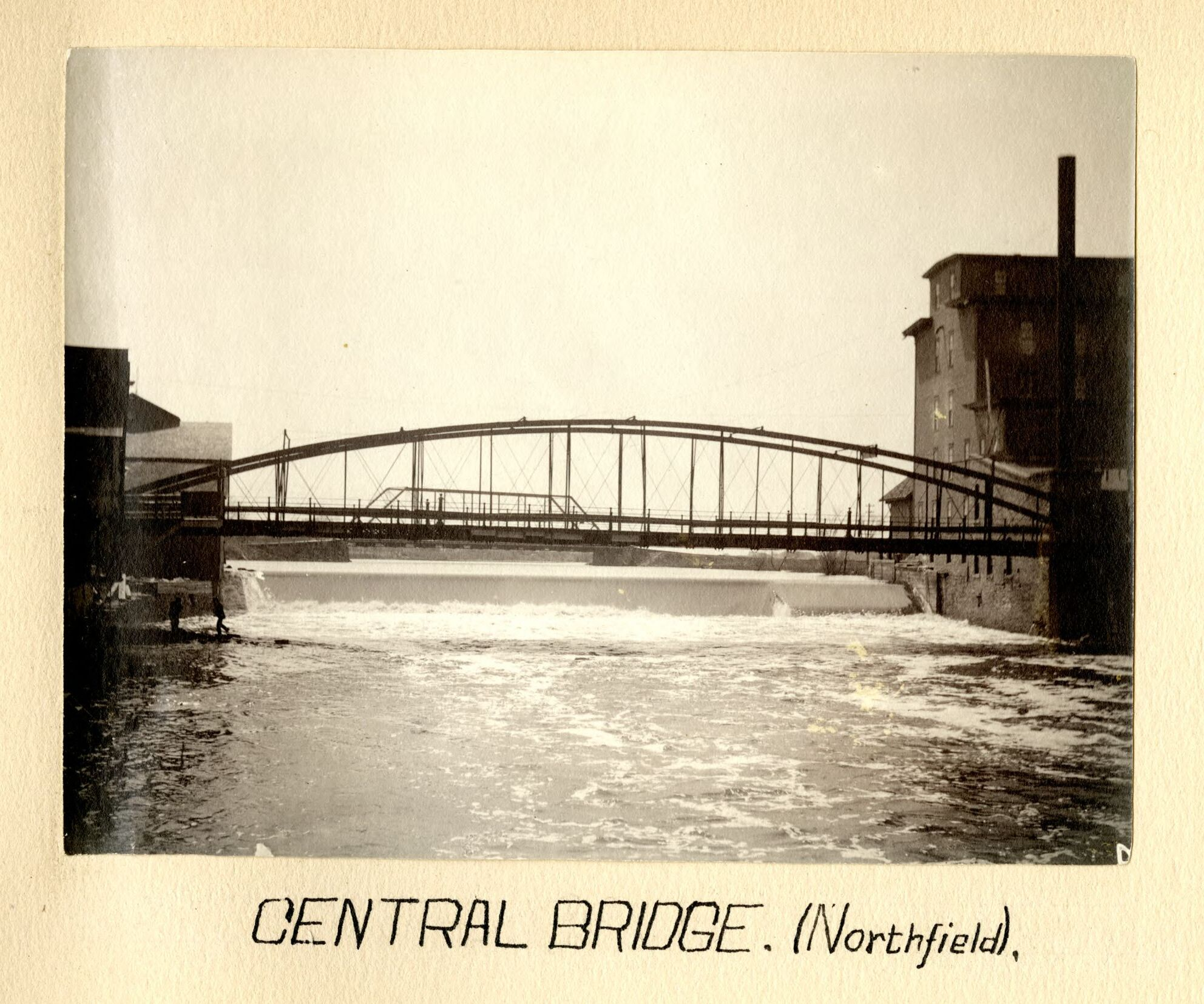
The Dam by Central Bridge, from Paul Barney, a Carleton student 1895 photo album

The Cannon River was first formed some 12,000 years ago in the wake of the receding Laurentide Ice Sheet. John North built the first mill in Northfield on the west bank in 1855. A flour mill on the East Bank followed shortly after. In 1865 the mill was sold to Captain Jesse Ames, from whom it later took its name. That same year the town was connected to Minneapolis and Chicago by Railroad, which encouraged the development of wheat agriculture in the surrounding area. In 1869 Ames rebuilt the mill on the west bank to be able to process 400 barrels of flour a day. The rebuilt mill used a new method of processing wheat that produced a finer, white flour that was highly valued by consumers. At the 1876 International Exhibition in Philadelphia, the flour from the Ames Mill was given the highest marking of any in the competition. By 1880, the Cannon River was no longer sufficient to supply the energy needs of the flour mill, and Ames installed a steam engine. In the 1880s, a combination of factors led to the decline in Northfield's milling industry. Blight disease hurt harvests, while the larger mills in Minneapolis outcompeted many smaller mills. Wheat itself fell out of favor for more profitable crops. The mill was sold several times in the following decades, often held for only a few years at a time. In 1927 it was bought by Campbell Cereal Company and was converted into a cereal manufacturing plant, which then served as the primary site of production for Malt-O-Meal hot cereal. The Campbell Cereal Company became the Malt-O-Meal Company in 1953. Malt-O-Meal became a subsidiary of Post Consumer Brands in 2015.

== Environmental impact ==
Dams in general impose numerous environmental threats. The Ames Mill Dam specifically impacts the Cannon River watershed ecosystem in a negative manner. The damming of the Cannon River has created habitat fragmentation and the separation of the Cannon River Watershed which comes with a high environmental cost. This fragmentation has led to a drop in native fish and freshwater mussel distribution and abundances.

=== Freshwater mussels ===
See also Freshwater bivalve Since the 1800s, the freshwater mussel population has been overharvesting for raw material in addition to the such for pearls. Additionally European Settlers in the 19th century built mills near the Cannon River and dams to power them. The damming increases sediment build up which damages mussel population. The Cannon River is home to 15 freshwater mussel species that belong to the Unionoida order and the class bivalvia.

=== Habitat and species loss ===
River mussels are a major indicator of water quality in rivers and streams. Mussels are filter feeders that improve ecosystem health by filtering out bacteria, algae, plankton, silts, and pollutants. They are essentially purifying the water. A healthy population of mussels leads to healthy river or stream quality. As freshwater mussel abundances drop, so does water quality and overall ecosystem health. Evidence shows that the implementation of Dams in MN has significantly decreased abundances and altered distributional patterns of this keystone species in river ecosystems. Specific to mussels around the Ames Mill Dam, studies show that there is massive distributional disruption and freshwater mussel species extinctions found in several areas of the Cannon River in Southeastern MN. This is largely an impact of the river habitat fragmentation created by the Ames Mill Dam. The existence of the dam in Northfield was found to severely affect mussel species and ecosystem health by creating this fragmentation that halts the migration of fish and decreases the distribution of mussel larvae. Mussels release glochidia, mussel larvae, which attach to the gills of host fish where they stay for weeks or even months before falling off as juvenile mussels. Due to the fragmentation of the river, some mussels with specific host fish have lost their ability to effectively reproduce as they are not able to use fish to disturb their larvae. The lack of host fish and the toxicity of the water caused by anthropogenic activities has led to the extinction of many native mussels species in Minnesota. The removal of the dam would increase connectivity and fish migration which would likely repopulate the area with mussels, significantly improving the health of the Cannon River ecosystem. This would also reestablish a healthy population of native fish and result in an overall increase in ecosystem biodiversity and productivity which may result in benefits for the community, especially the local fisherman community.

== Debate over removal, restoration, and repair ==
For overall discussion on removal of dams see Dam removal.

Since the 2000s there has been ample discussion in the Northfield community and at the state level about the fate of the Ames Mill Dam. In 2007, investigation by the state into unsafe conditions created by water flowing over the dam led the owners at the time, the Malt-O-Meal Company, to create a development plan that would replace the dam with a sloping bed of rocks. In 2009, the Minnesota Department of Natural Resources subsequently prioritized funding for the dam to be made "less dangerous and better for wildlife", placing it fifth on a list of 104 projects. As of December 2021, this project has still not been followed through on. In 2010, severe flooding on the section of the Cannon River running through downtown Northfield reignited the debate over the necessity of the dam, which was said to have increased the turbulence and velocity of the flooding by local residents, making the flooding more dangerous to nearby businesses. A student paper from nearby Carleton College, after weighing various approaches to the problem, eventually settled on supporting removal. Meanwhile, some community members expressed concern over its removal, mostly on the grounds of aesthetics and resistance to change. Most recently in September 2020, the City of Northfield announced their Riverfront Enhancement Action Plan. This plan outlines a framework for future improvements and designs of parks and riverside spaces. Included in that framework was a study done on the feasibility of reconstruction/removal, with potential plans to create a more gradually sloping structure in the place of the dam. However, there have since been some community concerns about the implementation of the plan, including how it could affect the town's annual Defeat of Jesse James Day festival and celebrations.
