= KYMN =

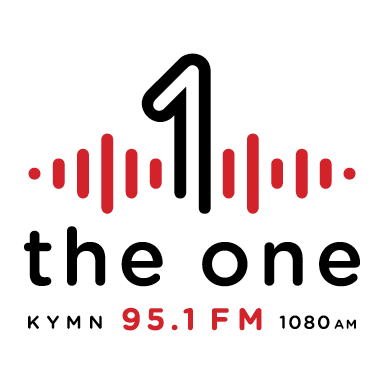

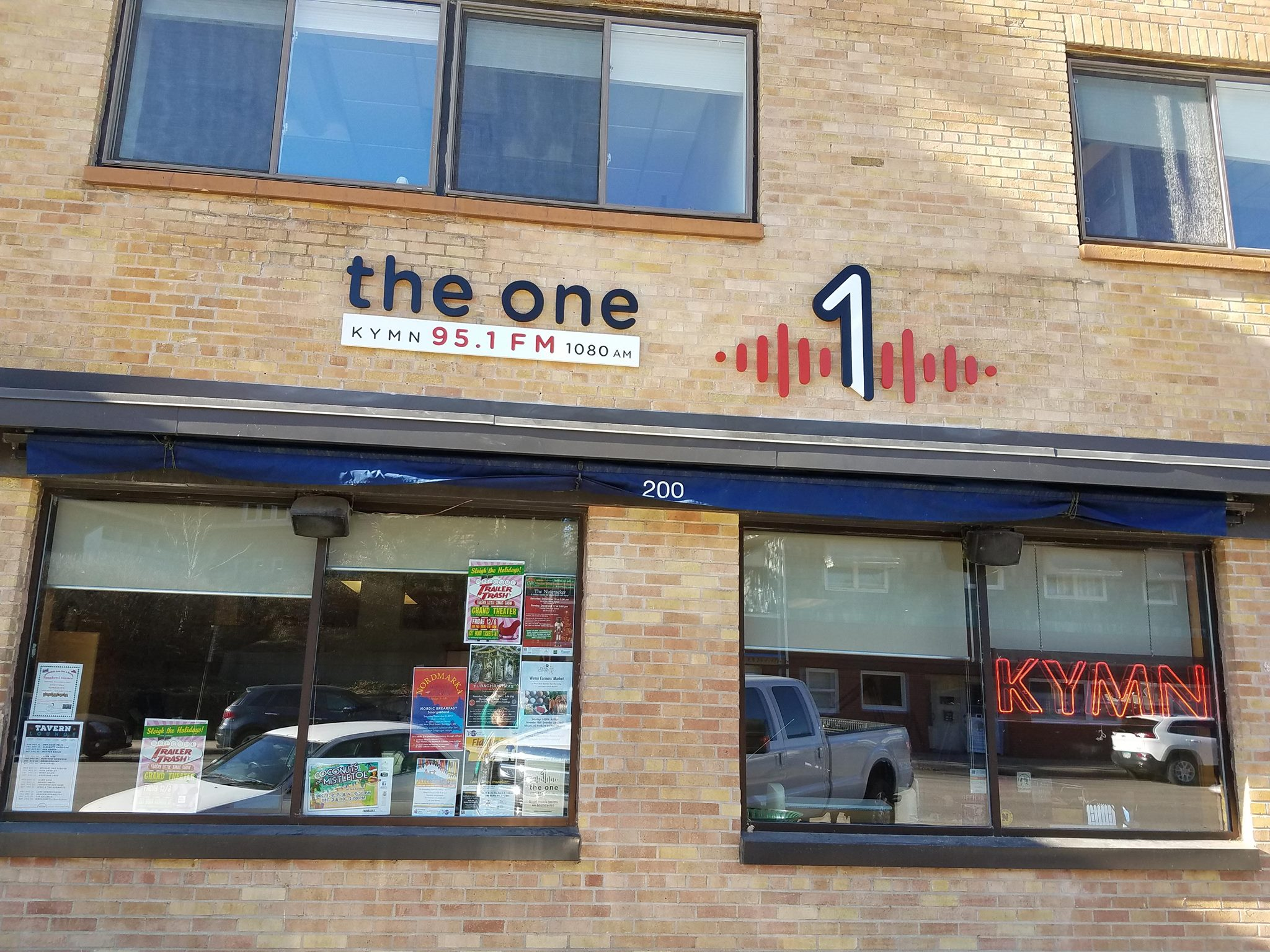
- A View of the KYMN Studio's on Division St. in Northfield, MN.
- Northfield, Minnesota; United States
- Frequency: 1080 kHz
- Branding: 95.1 The One

Programming
- Format: full serviceAAA
- Affiliations: Minnesota News Network; Minnesota Twins; Minnesota Timberwolves

Ownership
- Owner: Northfield Media, Inc.

History
- First air date: September 27, 1968

Technical information
- Licensing authority: FCC
- Facility ID: 36013
- Class: D
- Power: 1,000 watts day; 11 watts night
- Transmitter coordinates: 44°29′12.00″N 93°6′19.00″W
- Translator: 95.1 K236CO (Northfield)

Links
- Public license information: Public file; LMS
- Webcast: Listen Live
- Website: kymnradio.net

KYMN (1080 AM) is a radio station broadcasting a news/talk and adult album alternative format. Licensed to Northfield, Minnesota, United States, the station primarily serves the cities of Northfield and Dundas in the southern portion of the Minneapolis-St. Paul area. The station is currently locally owned by Northfield Media, Inc., owned by Jeff Johnson, long time morning show host of KYMN. KYMN's music and entertainment programs are all made locally with state news provided by the Minnesota News Network.

KYMN is an affiliate of the Minnesota Twins baseball team on the Treasure Island Baseball network.

== History ==
KYMN has served the Northfield community at 1080 AM since 1968. Founder Stan Stydnicki launched the station to provide an eclectic mix of programs, including community news, sports and music.

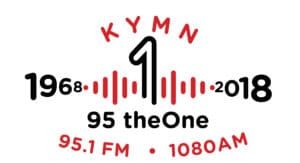
KYMN Radio's special 50th anniversary logo.

In March 1983, KYMN became the first station in Minnesota and first daytimer in the world to adopt AM stereo. Beginning with the Harris System and later switching to the C-QUAM system. KYMN has since discontinued broadcasting in AM stereo.

A new FM signal, K236CD, launched in 2016, sending the station's signal to the surrounding communities of Cannon Falls, Nerstrand, Faribault and Lonsdale.

KYMN has won the best of radio station in Southern Minnesota award, 5 times. Several hosts at KYMN have also won the best radio host in Southern Minnesota. Both awards are given by the Southern Minnesota Scene Magazine.

The station will be sold in the fall of 2024 to its current news director Rich Larson, as owner Jeff Johnson is retiring.
