= Doug Zmolek =

American ice hockey player

- Born: November 3, 1970 (age 55) Rochester, Minnesota, U.S.
- Height: 6 ft 2 in (188 cm)
- Weight: 220 lb (100 kg; 15 st 10 lb)
- Position: Defense
- Shot: Left
- Played for: San Jose Sharks; Dallas Stars; Los Angeles Kings; Chicago Blackhawks
- National team: United States
- NHL draft: 7th overall, 1989; Minnesota North Stars
- Playing career: 1992–2000

Douglas Allan Zmolek (born November 3, 1970) is an American former professional ice hockey defenseman who played in the NHL for eight seasons between 1992 and 2000.

== Playing career ==
Zmolek graduated from John Marshall High School in 1989. He was drafted seventh overall by the Minnesota North Stars in the 1989 NHL entry draft held in Minnesota. Zmolek attended the University of Minnesota of the WCHA and was named to the WCHA Second All-Star Team and the NCAA Second All-American Team in his junior, and final, year in 1992.

Zmolek made his debut in the NHL in the 1992–93 season with the San Jose Sharks after he was earlier acquired from the North Stars in the dispersal draft on May 30, 1991. In his second year, Zmolek was traded back to the Stars franchise which had relocated to Dallas.

As a physical stay-at-home defenseman, Zmolek spent parts of two seasons with Dallas before stints with the Los Angeles Kings and Chicago Blackhawks. Zmolek retired after receiving a buyout during the 2000–01 season after playing two games with the Chicago Wolves of the IHL.

Zmolek played 467 career NHL games, scoring 11 goals and 53 assists for 64 points and registering 905 penalty minutes.

Since retirement, Zmolek has supported the Rochester Youth Hockey Association (RYHA) as an advisor and member of the board. He also runs an off-season hockey camp, Top Shelf, in Rochester, MN. He has three sons, Riese, William, and Bennett, who all play hockey, and a daughter, Ella.

== Awards and honors ==
Award	Year
All-WCHA Second Team	1991–92
AHCA West Second-Team All-American	1991–92
WCHA All-Tournament Team	1992

== Career statistics ==
=== Regular season and playoffs ===
			Regular season					Playoffs
Season	Team	League	GP	G	A	Pts	PIM	GP	G	A	Pts	PIM
1985–86	John Marshall High School	HS-MN	—	—	—	—	—	—	—	—	—	—
1986–87	John Marshall High School	HS-MN	—	7	13	20	—	—	—	—	—	—
1987–88	John Marshall High School	HS-MN	27	4	32	36	—	—	—	—	—	—
1988–89	John Marshall High School	HS-MN	29	17	41	58	—	—	—	—	—	—
1989–90	University of Minnesota	WCHA	40	1	10	11	52	—	—	—	—	—
1990–91	University of Minnesota	WCHA	42	3	15	18	94	—	—	—	—	—
1991–92	University of Minnesota	WCHA	44	6	21	27	88	—	—	—	—	—
1992–93	San Jose Sharks	NHL	84	5	10	15	229	—	—	—	—	—
1993–94	San Jose Sharks	NHL	68	0	4	4	122	—	—	—	—	—
1993–94	Dallas Stars	NHL	7	1	0	1	11	7	0	1	1	4
1994–95	Dallas Stars	NHL	42	0	5	5	67	5	0	0	0	10
1995–96	Dallas Stars	NHL	42	1	5	6	65	—	—	—	—	—
1995–96	Los Angeles Kings	NHL	16	1	0	1	22	—	—	—	—	—
1996–97	Los Angeles Kings	NHL	57	1	0	1	116	—	—	—	—	—
1997–98	Los Angeles Kings	NHL	46	0	8	8	111	2	0	0	0	2
1998–99	Chicago Blackhawks	NHL	62	0	14	14	102	—	—	—	—	—
1999–00	Chicago Blackhawks	NHL	43	2	7	9	60	—	—	—	—	—
2000–01	Chicago Wolves	IHL	2	0	0	0	2	—	—	—	—	—
NHL totals			467	11	53	64	905	14	0	1	1	16

=== International ===
Year	Team	Event	GP	G	A	Pts	PIM
1990	United States	WJC	7	0	1	1	2
Junior totals			7	0	1	1	2

Sporting positions
Preceded by Mike Modano	Minnesota North Stars first-round draft pick 1989	Succeeded by Derian Hatcher
