= Shjon Podein =

American ice hockey player (born 1968)

- Born: March 5, 1968 (age 58) Rochester, Minnesota, U.S.
- Height: 6 ft 2 in (188 cm)
- Weight: 200 lb (91 kg; 14 st 4 lb)
- Position: Left wing
- Shot: Left
- Played for: Edmonton Oilers; Philadelphia Flyers; Colorado Avalanche; St. Louis Blues
- National team: United States
- NHL draft: 166th overall, 1988; Edmonton Oilers
- Playing career: 1990–2006

Shjon Walter Podein (born March 5, 1968) is an American former professional ice hockey left winger who played 11 seasons in the National Hockey League (NHL) for the Edmonton Oilers, Philadelphia Flyers, Colorado Avalanche and St. Louis Blues. He was named the Head High School Hockey Coach at Benilde-St. Margaret's School in St. Louis Park (MN) High School on March 16, 2011. He had been active in the youth program for three years before being named coach.

== Playing career ==
Podein graduated from John Marshall High School in 1986. He originally enrolled at US International University, but left the team mid-year to transfer to the University of Minnesota-Duluth in the WCHA. While ineligible as a transfer student, he finished the year with the Rochester Mustangs of the USHL. After his sophomore year, the Edmonton Oilers drafted him 166th in the 1988 NHL entry draft.

Podein made his professional debut in the 1990–91 season with the Cape Breton Oilers of the AHL. He made his NHL debut in the 1992–93 season with the Oilers but was returned to Cape Breton, where he won the Calder Cup. Over the next season Podein saw limited time with the parent club and was signed as a free agent by the Philadelphia Flyers on July 27, 1994.

With the Flyers, Podein developed into a penalty-killer and checking forward. Podein played five seasons and over 300 games with Philadelphia, and reached the Stanley Cup Final in 1997, won by the Detroit Red Wings .

On November 12, 1998, the Flyers traded Podein to the Colorado Avalanche for Keith Jones. While helping Colorado capture the Stanley Cup in the 2000–01 season, Shjon also scored a career-high 15 goals and equaled his best points total at 32. Shjon is often remembered for wearing his uniform a full 25 hours after winning game seven of the Stanley Cup Final.

The Avalanche traded Podein to the St. Louis Blues for Mike Keane on February 11, 2002. Shjon played his last NHL season in 2002–03. He then played in Sweden with Växjö Lakers Hockey and finished his career in Japan with the HC Nikko Icebucks.

Away from the ice, Shjon set up the "Shjon Podein Children's Foundation". Podein was noted for his dedication to charity work and youth hockey programs. In recognition, Podein received the King Clancy Memorial Trophy in 2001.

Podein did the traditional "Let's play hockey" cheer for the Minnesota Wild game on Feb. 19, 2008.

== Career statistics ==
=== Regular season and playoffs ===
			Regular season					Playoffs
Season	Team	League	GP	G	A	Pts	PIM	GP	G	A	Pts	PIM
1985–86	John Marshall High School	HS-MN	25	34	30	64	—	—	—	—	—	—
1986–87	Rochester Mustangs	USHL	29	17	21	39	—	—	—	—	—	—
1986–87	United States International University	GWHC	6	0	1	1	0	—	—	—	—	—
1987–88	University of Minnesota Duluth	WCHA	30	4	4	8	49	—	—	—	—	—
1988–89	University of Minnesota Duluth	WCHA	36	7	5	12	46	—	—	—	—	—
1989–90	University of Minnesota Duluth	WCHA	35	21	18	39	45	—	—	—	—	—
1990–91	Cape Breton Oilers	AHL	63	14	15	29	65	4	0	0	0	5
1991–92	Cape Breton Oilers	AHL	80	30	24	54	46	5	3	1	4	2
1992–93	Cape Breton Oilers	AHL	38	18	21	39	32	9	2	2	4	29
1992–93	Edmonton Oilers	NHL	40	13	6	19	25	—	—	—	—	—
1993–94	Cape Breton Oilers	AHL	5	4	4	8	4	—	—	—	—	—
1993–94	Edmonton Oilers	NHL	28	3	5	8	8	—	—	—	—	—
1994–95	Philadelphia Flyers	NHL	44	3	7	10	33	15	1	3	4	10
1995–96	Philadelphia Flyers	NHL	79	15	10	25	89	12	1	2	3	50
1996–97	Philadelphia Flyers	NHL	82	14	18	32	41	19	4	3	7	16
1997–98	Philadelphia Flyers	NHL	82	11	13	24	53	5	0	0	0	10
1998–99	Philadelphia Flyers	NHL	14	1	0	1	0	—	—	—	—	—
1998–99	Colorado Avalanche	NHL	41	2	6	8	24	19	1	1	2	12
1999–00	Colorado Avalanche	NHL	75	11	8	19	29	17	5	0	5	8
2000–01	Colorado Avalanche	NHL	82	15	17	32	68	23	2	3	5	14
2001–02	Colorado Avalanche	NHL	41	6	6	12	39	—	—	—	—	—
2001–02	St. Louis Blues	NHL	23	2	4	6	2	10	0	0	0	6
2002–03	St. Louis Blues	NHL	68	4	6	10	28	7	0	1	1	6
2003–04	Växjö Lakers	Allsv	33	11	16	27	52	5	0	0	0	2
2004–05	Växjö Lakers	Allsv	29	9	12	21	38	1	0	0	0	25
2005–06	Nikkō Ice Bucks	ALH	26	7	7	14	55	3	0	3	3	10
NHL totals			699	100	106	206	439	127	14	13	27	132

=== International ===
Year	Team	Event	Result	GP	G	A	Pts	PIM
1993	United States	WC	6th	6	1	3	4	8
1994	United States	WC	4th	8	3	1	4	14
1998	United States	WC	12th	4	0	0	0	4
Senior totals				18	4	4	8	26

== Awards and honors ==
Award	Year
AHL
Calder Cup (Cape Breton Oilers)	1992–93
NHL
Stanley Cup (Colorado Avalanche)	2000–01
King Clancy Memorial Trophy	2000–01

Awards and achievements
Preceded by Curtis Joseph	Winner of the King Clancy Memorial Trophy; 2001	Succeeded by Ron Francis
