= John Marshall High School (Minnesota) =

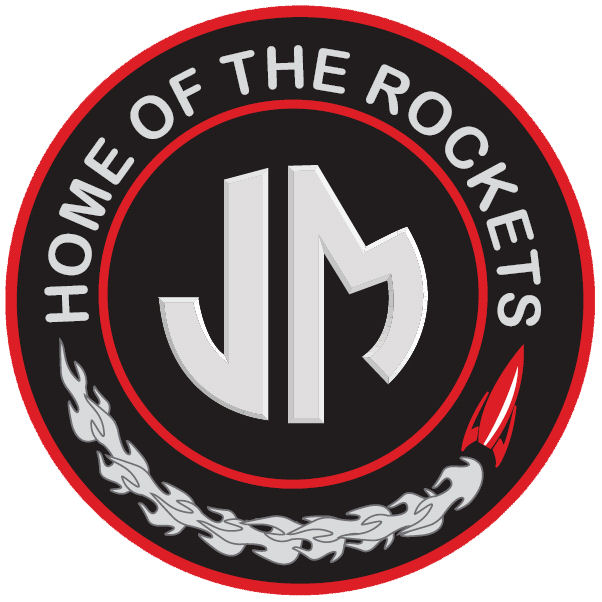

Location
- 1510 14th Street Northwest; Rochester, Minnesota 55901; United States; 44°02′08″N 92°29′06″W

Information
- Type: Public High School
- Motto: "A Mark of Excellence"
- Established: 1958
- School district: Independent School District #535
- Principal: Matt Ruzek
- Grades: 9–12
- Enrollment: 1,549 (2024–2025)
- Campus type: Urban
- Colors: Red and Black
- Mascot: Rocket Man
- Newspaper: The Rocket
- Yearbook: Rochord
- Website: johnmarshall.rochester.k12.mn.us

John Marshall High School is located in Rochester, Minnesota, United States and is part of Independent School District #535. The school is named after the longest serving Chief Justice in Supreme Court history, John Marshall. It is one of three public high schools in Rochester. Enrollment was 1,727 students during the 2018–2019 school year, in grades 9–12.

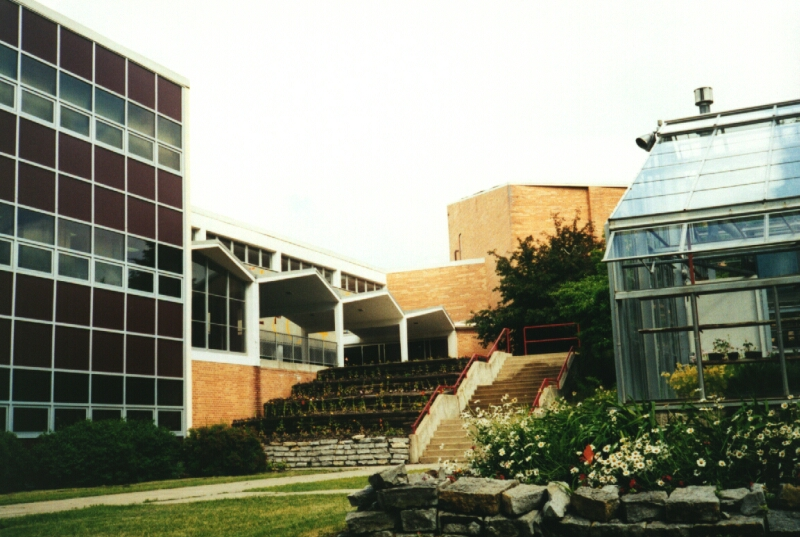
View from the Courtyard of John Marshall High School (1999)

== History ==
John Marshall High School is located in Rochester, Minnesota. It is the oldest public high school in the city, established in 1958 to accommodate a student population that had outgrown the original Rochester High School.

In 1953, city leaders began to consider sites for the new high school that was to become John Marshall. According to a Rochester Post-Bulletin article: "[t]he city council and school board favored a Soldiers Field location, but were unsure the city could sell a portion of the park to the school board. The state attorney general ruled it could, and things started heating up. In March 1954, the Legion Post voted unanimously to oppose the location. In April, the city council declared a portion of Soldiers Field no longer needed for park purposes. Mayor Claude H. "Boney" McQuillan, a former pro boxer and Green Bay Packers player, opposed the location and vetoed the resolution. The council overrode the veto only to be countered by the mayor's refusal to sign a deed to transfer the land title. The argument went to court, where District Judge Arnold Hatfield ruled the veto was in order. John Marshall High School in northwest Rochester emerged from this turbulent beginning."

Often referred to as "JM", John Marshall adopted "The Rocket" as its official mascot and red and black as the official school colors. "A mark of excellence" is the motto of the school. After years of discussion, major renovations began in the summer of 2005 to expand the institution's space and upgrade its facilities. Notably, a modern science wing was completed in the summer of 2006. The entire reconstruction project was completed in 2008, when John Marshall celebrated its 50th anniversary.

== Academics ==
JM has a variety of Advanced Placement, honors-level classes, and post-secondary enrollment options available to its students.

The school has a Math Team, Science Olympiad team, Business Professionals of America, and Science Fair, with participants and teams routinely advancing to state, national, and international levels of competition.

The school also has a variety of other academic and extracurricular organizations, including National Honor Society, a robotics team, a chess team, a Latin club, amongst many others.

The graduation rate in 2017 was 91%.

== Athletics ==
Rochester John Marshall is a member of the Big Nine Conference.

The John Marshall boys' hockey team is the only hockey team from the Big 9 to ever win the Minnesota State Hockey Tournament, in 1977.

The John Marshall Football Team won State Championships in 1973 and 1974.

== Arts ==
The bands at John Marshall are the Concert Band (ninth grade band), Symphonic Band (standard band for tenth graders and up), and Symphonic Winds (Honors band). In the fall, the Symphonic Winds and the Symphonic Band combine to make the John Marshall Marching Band. The marching band plays at the football team's home games. The John Marshall Marching Band won state competitions in the years 1980–1984, 1987–1992, and 2004–present.

John Marshall also has two orchestras, Art Club, Jazz Ensemble, Color Guard, Yearbook committee, Newspaper committee, and other fine arts groups.

== Notable alumni ==
- Eric Butorac – professional tennis player
- Tyler Cain – professional basketball player
- Matthew Hurt – professional basketball player
- Shjon Podein – NHL hockey player
- Marcus Sherels – NFL cornerback
- Darrell Thompson – NFL running back
- Igor Vovkovinskiy – Tallest person in US
- Doug Zmolek – NHL hockey player
