= Northfield High School =

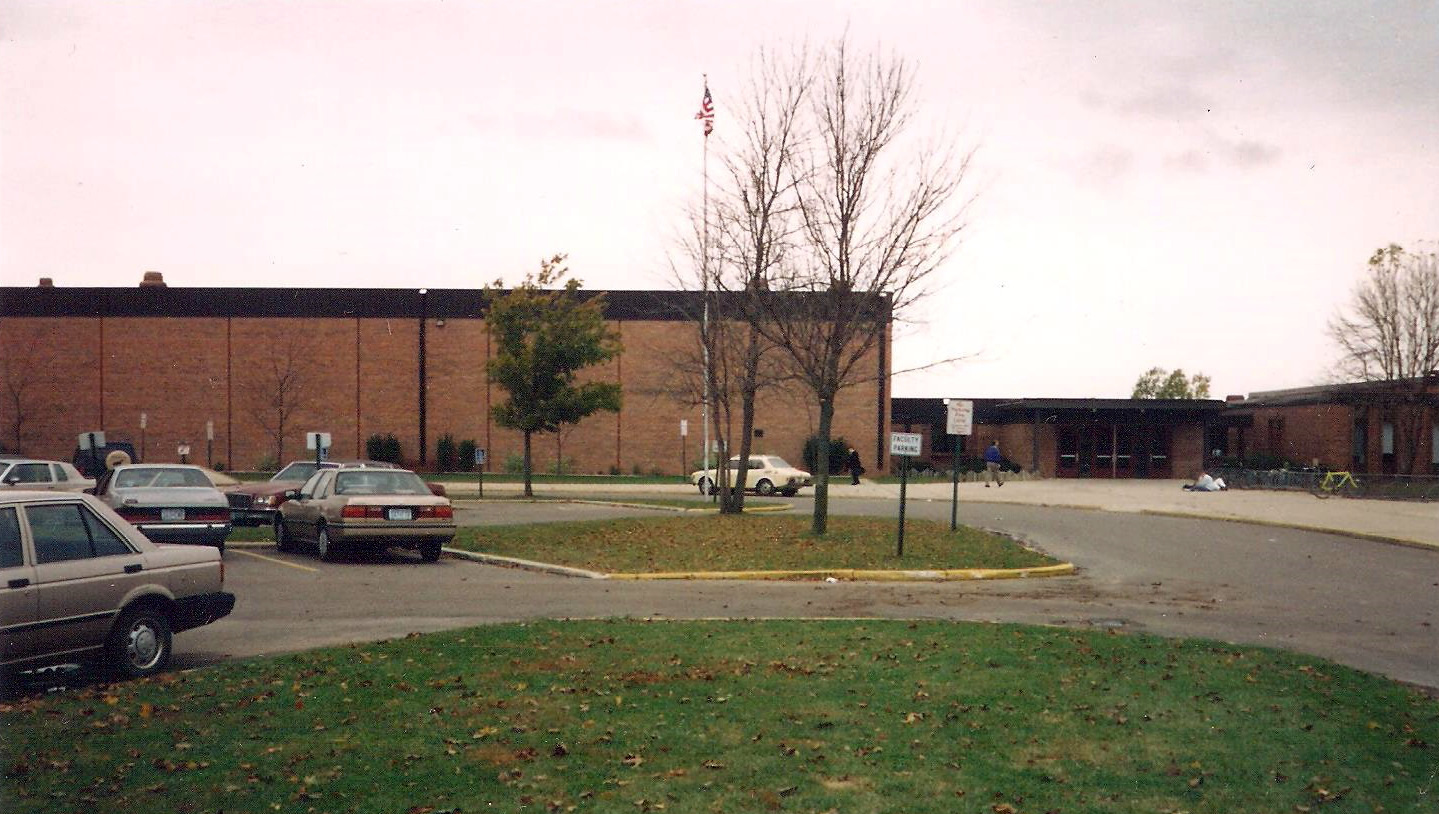
- Northfield High School in 1993

Location
- 1400 Division Street South; Northfield, Minnesota 55057; United States
- 44°26′39″N 93°9′50″W

Information
- Type: Public high school
- Motto: Academics, Athletics, Arts, Excellence
- Established: 1966
- School district: Independent School District 659
- Superintendent: Matt Hillmann
- Principal: Chris Dibble
- Assistant Principal: Rico Bohren
- Dean of Students: Sean DuBe
- Faculty: 146
- Teaching staff: 85
- Grades: 9-12
- Enrollment: 1,295 (2023-2024)
- Colors: Maroon, Gold,
- Mascot: Cow
- Nickname: Raiders
- Yearbook: Norhian
- Website: www.northfieldschools.org

Northfield High School (NHS) is a comprehensive, public high school in Northfield, Minnesota, United States. The school was built in 1966, with additions in 1993 and 1997. It is situated on a 52-acre campus south of downtown Northfield. The school hosts grades 9–12. As of 2025 there are 1,250 students and 135 faculty members. This includes the school's 85 teaching staff, along with administrative, custodial, kitchen, and special education staff.

The school is a part of Northfield Public Schools (ISD #659), and is affiliated with the Minnesota State High School League (MSHSL). The school is a member of the Big 9 Conference.

== History ==
The first schoolhouse was built because of Ann North (wife of founder John W. North) less than a year after the town was founded. In 1910, a new high school was built for $90,000 after the old one burned down in 1908. This building was located near downtown Northfield. At the time it was considered the ideal school building. An auditorium was added in 1936, as well as an east wing/gymnasium in 1954. Even with the addition of the east wing, the population grew so large that the space the school could provide was not enough. To cope with space issues a new high school was constructed at its current location in 1966. The old high school building became the Northfield Middle School, until the middle school was moved to a new building next to the high school in 2004. The old middle school building is currently The Weitz Center for Creativity belonging to Carleton College.

== Reimagine Northfield High School Project ==
On November 5, 2024, Northfield voters passed 3 ballot questions for major renovations to the Northfield high school building that are planned to be finished by Fall 2029. Plans include a new multi story classroom addition, expanded gymnasium with walking track, a new geothermal HVAC system, and renovation of remaining original sections.

== Academics ==
At Northfield High School, students attend seven class periods on a two semester schedule. Students are required to have a minimum of 23 credits to graduate. Some courses such as English, social studies, science, and math are required. Students also need physical education, art, and health. There are also many electives a student can choose from ranging in a variety of topics from child care and development, to business, to auto shop classes.

=== Advanced Coursework ===
Northfield High school offers sixteen Advanced Placement (AP) classes, and eleven honors/advanced courses. Students have the choice of taking advanced courses in many areas, such as history, math, science, and art.

=== LINK Program ===
Northfield High School has a Link Crew transition program, which strives to welcome the freshman class on the first day of school as well as continue to support them throughout their first year of high school. Link leaders are a group of Juniors and Seniors who undergo training, and are then assigned to a small group of incoming freshman students. They work with this same group of freshman for the entire school year and meet with their group periodically. The goal of Link Crew is to help incoming students be more comfortable with the transition to high school, achieve academic success and build personal connections.

=== English Language Learners ===
Students whose primary language is not English are eligible for individualized instructional services. To be able to qualify for these services the student's parent or guardian has to indicate that the student's first language learned was a language other than English. The student must also score as having limited English proficiency on nationally normalized assessments of their English skills in reading, writing, listening, and speaking.

== Extracurricular activities ==
=== Athletics ===
There are many different sports teams to choose from. The sports are offered in three different seasons Fall, Winter, and Spring.

- Fall sports include cheer team, boys'/girls' cross country, football, boys'/girls' soccer, girls' swim and dive, girls' tennis, girls' volleyball, and bowling.
- Winter sports include cheer team, dance team (high kick and jazz), boys'/girls' alpine skiing, boys'/girls' Nordic skiing, girls' gymnastics, boy's/girls' basketball, boys'/girls' hockey, boys' swim and dive, weightlifting, and wrestling.
- Spring sports include baseball, clay target, girls' softball, boys'/girls' track, boys' tennis, boys'/girls' golf and boys'/girls' lacrosse.

=== Music ===
Northfield High School offers band, jazz band, choir, and orchestra.

=== Theater ===
Northfield High School presents a Fall and Spring play annually, and the school puts on a biennial "Rock and Roll Revival" show involving a cast of students singing primarily classic rock and roll music with an accompanying live band of students.

=== Clubs ===
There are many different clubs for students to be involved in. Clubs include Chess team, Diversity club, Knowledge Bowl, Yearbook, Mock trial, Robotics team, Science Olympiad, Speech team, Student Council, National Honor Society, Black student union, Fellowship of Christian Athletes, and R.A.L.I.E.

== Notable alumni ==
- Sylvia Chase, radio and television journalist
- Alexandra Holden, actress
- Siri Hustvedt, novelist
- Hannah Lewis, scholar
- Chad Setterstrom, American football player
- Ben Wang, actor
- Peder Lindell, actor
