= Grace Fallow Norton =

American poet

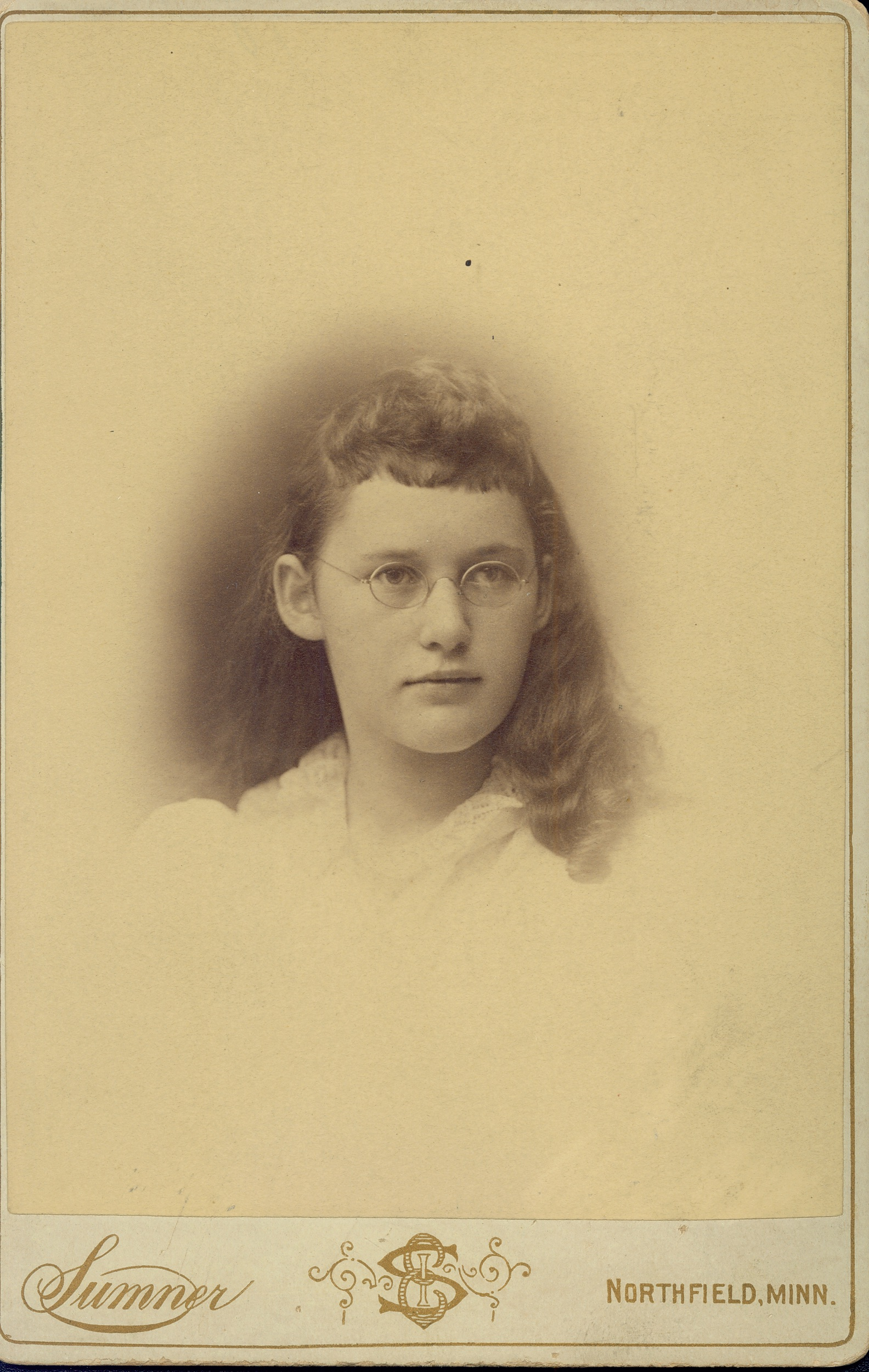
- Born: October 29, 1876; Northfield
- Died: 1962
- Occupation: Writer
- Spouse(s): Herman de Fremery, George Herbert Macrum

Grace Fallow Norton (29 October 1876 – 1962) was an American poet. Though her work is obscure today, in the early twentieth century it was praised by poets like Robert Frost and Amy Lowell.

Grace Fallow Norton was born on 29 October 1876, in Northfield, Minnesota, the daughter of Willis H. Norton, founder of the Citizens Bank in Northfield. Her parents died when she was young, and she was raised by relatives. Her family were particularly strict Congregationalists who disapproved of music, but with the support of her elder sister and her brother-in-law, she was able to study music. Norton studied at Carleton College, Abbot Academy in Andover, Massachusetts, and with teachers in Boston and Berlin.

She settled in New York City in 1899. Starting around 1910, her poetry began to appear in leading publications like The Atlantic Monthly, The Century Magazine, Scribner’s Magazine, Harper’s Monthly, McClure’s, and Poetry, as well as her friend Emma Goldman's anarchist publication, Mother Earth. In 1912 she published her first collection, Little Gray Songs from St. Joseph’s, about a girl dying in a convent. It was praised by the New York Times as “a revelation of what genius can do with the ordinary and every-day things of life.”

In 1909, she married Herman de Fremery, a curator at the American Museum of Natural History, though she continued to publish under her maiden name. She dedicated her first book to him, though their marriage was soon effectively over at the time of its publication. He began a relationship with Henrietta Rodman while she began one with the painter George Herbert Macrum. After their divorce, they both married their new partners.

In 1914, she published her second collection, The Sister of the Wind, which included her best-known work, "Love Is a Terrible Thing." The Marcums travelled to France that May and were stranded first in Brittany, then Cornwall as a result of mobilizations for World War I. They returned to the US in November. Norton published a volume of poetry inspired by her experiences witnessing WWI preparations, Roads, as well as a pamphlet of patriotic verse with a blood-red cover called What is Your Legion?

Norton worked as a translator, resulting in a bestseller, The Odyssey of a Torpedoed Transport (1917). This novel by Maurice Larrouy purported to be a real series of letters from an anonymous French merchant seaman. The Marcums lived in France in the 1920s and 30s, but returned to America before World War II and settled in Sloatsburg, New York.

On a visit to the visitor's gallery above the US Senate chamber in the 1950s, Norton had to be prevented from spitting on the head of Senator Joseph McCarthy.

== Bibliography ==
- Little Gray Songs from St. Joseph's (1912)
- The Sister of the Wind and Other Poems (1914)
- Roads (1916)
- What is Your Legion? (1916)
- The Miller's Youngest Daughter (1924)

== List of poems ==
- Allegra Agonistes
- I Give Thanks
- Make No Vows
