= Northfield, Minnesota =

City in Minnesota, United States

- City
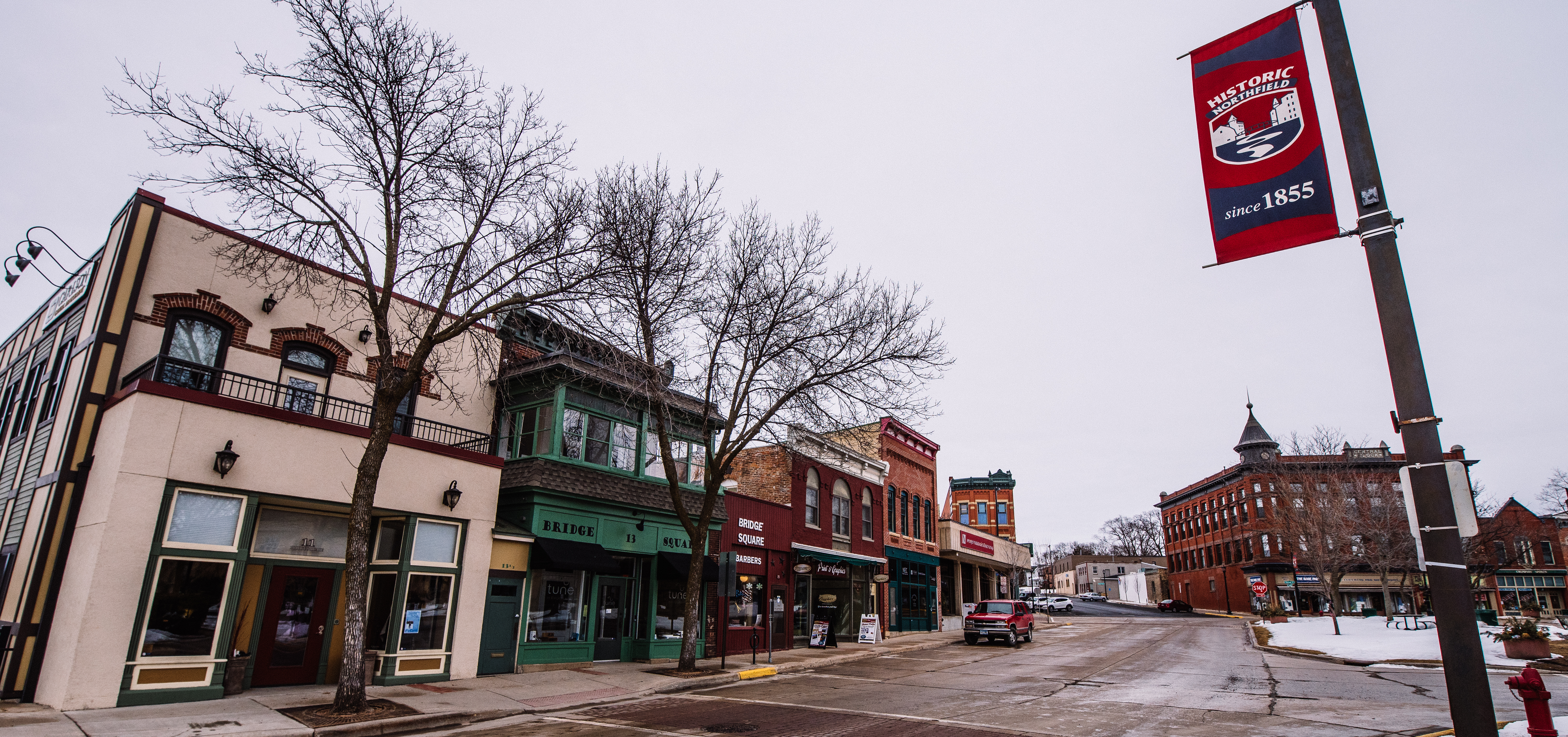
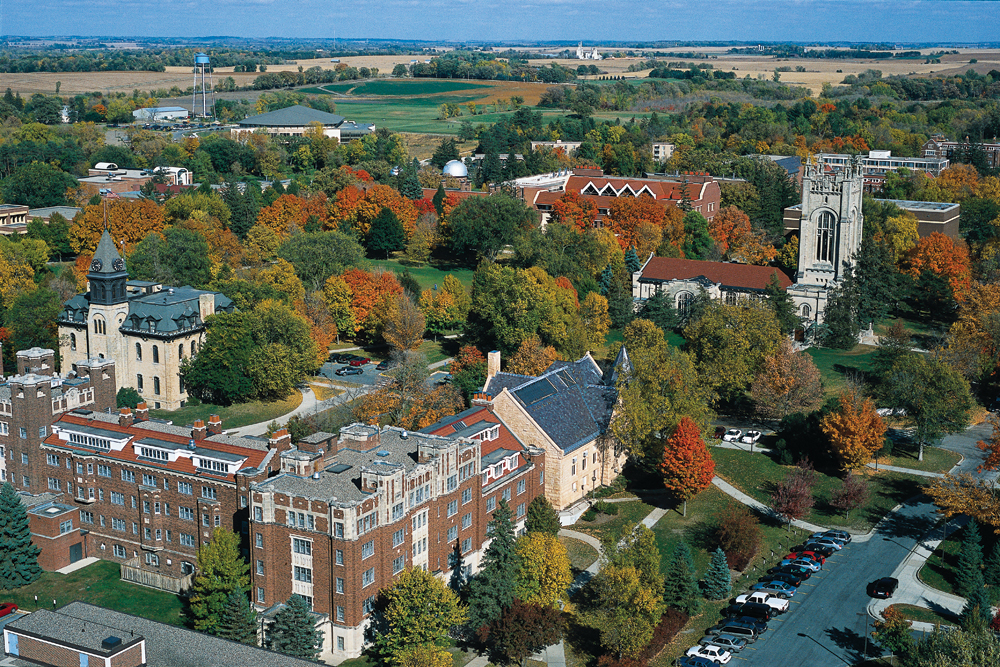
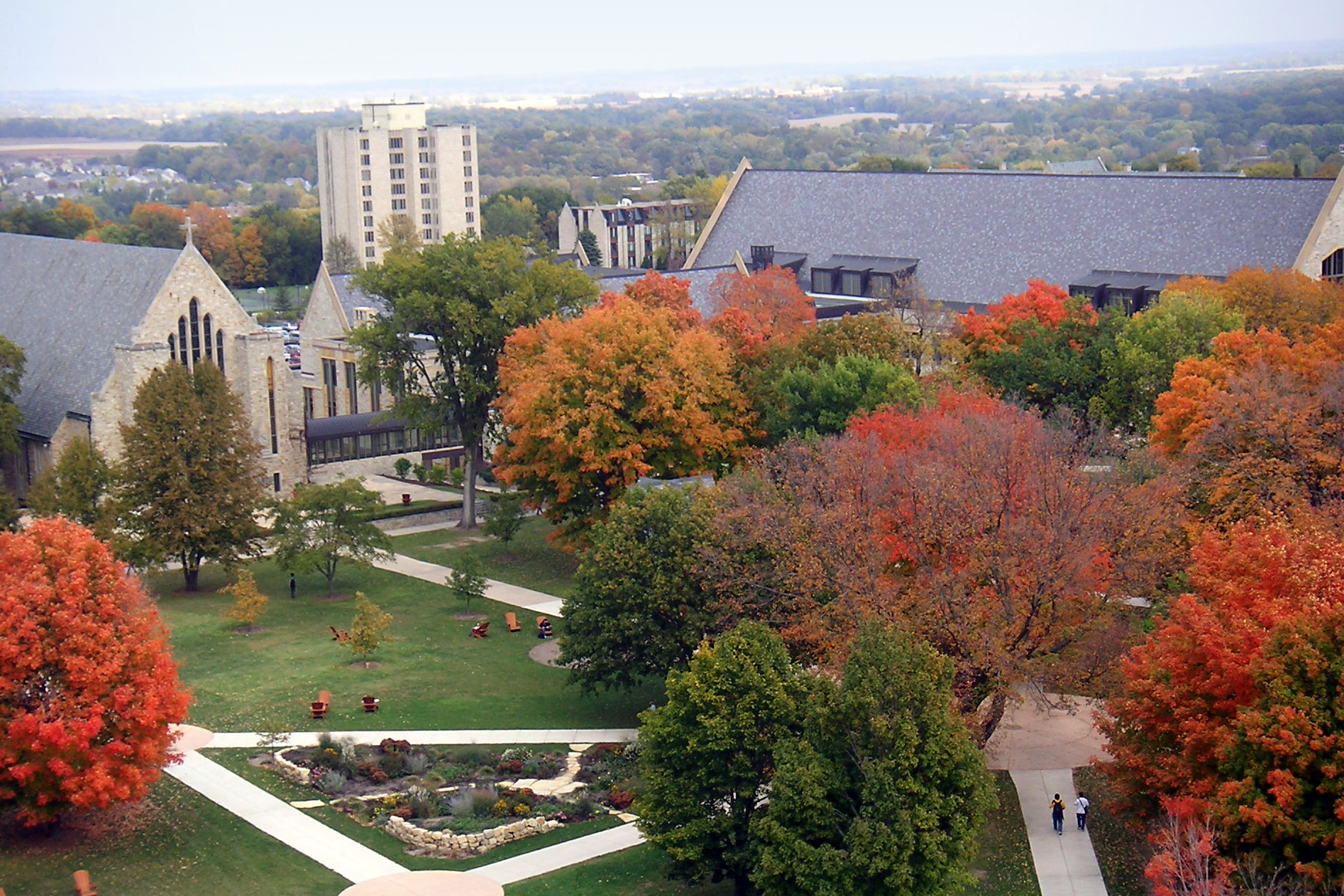
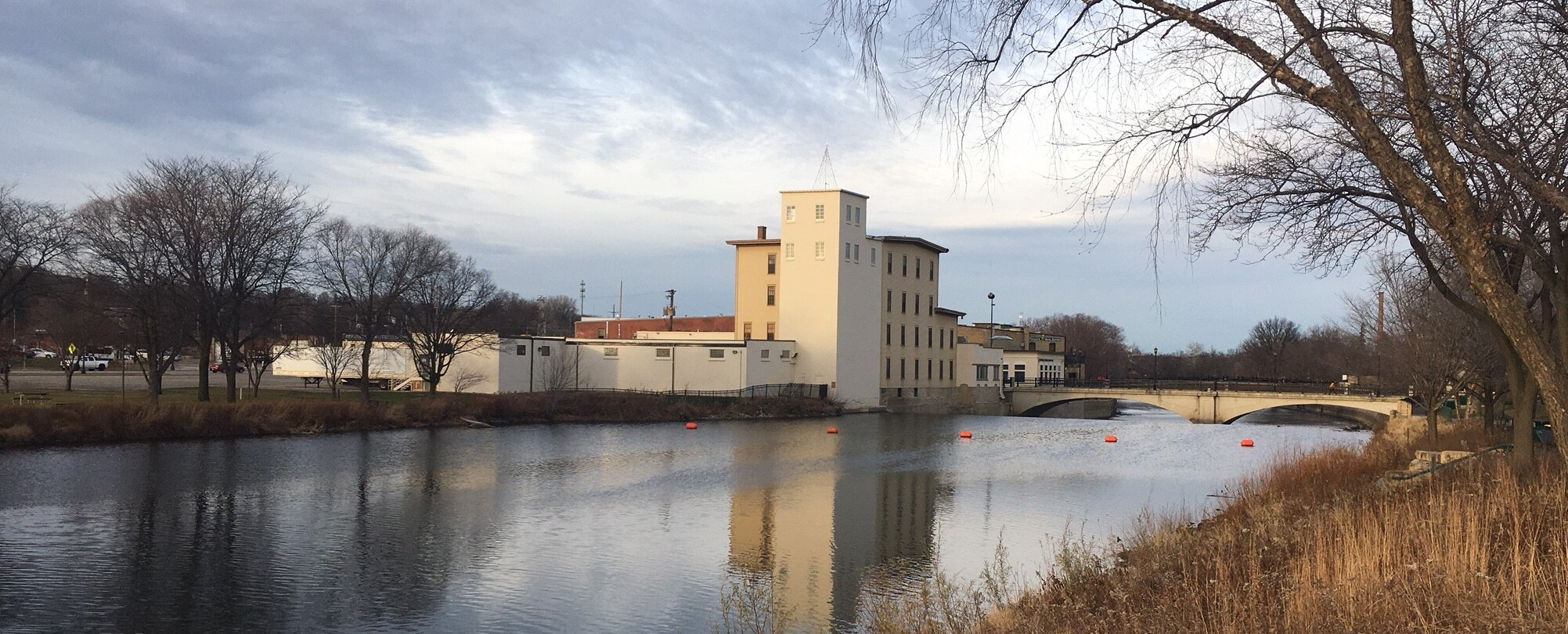
- Downtown Northfield Carleton College St. Olaf College Cannon River and Ames Mill Dam
- Motto: "Cows, College, and Contentment"
- Location of Northfield within Rice County, Minnesota
- Coordinates: 44°27′18″N 93°10′11″W
- Country: United States
- State: Minnesota
- Counties: Rice, Dakota
- Platted: October 1855
- Incorporated (village): 1871
- Incorporated (city): February 26, 1875

Government
  - Type: Mayor–council
  - Mayor: Erica Zweifel

Area
  - City: 8.53 sq mi (22.10 km^{2})
  - Land: 8.51 sq mi (22.03 km^{2})
  - Water: 0.023 sq mi (0.06 km^{2}) 0.58%
- Elevation: 925 ft (282 m)

Population (2020)
  - City: 20,790
  - Estimate (2022): 20,924
  - Density: 2,443.8/sq mi (943.55/km^{2})
  - Urban: 22,686
  - Metro: 67,693
- Time zone: UTC–6 (Central (CST))
  - Summer (DST): UTC–5 (CDT)
- ZIP Code: 55057
- Area code: 507
- FIPS code: 27-46924
- GNIS feature ID: 2395265
- Sales tax: 7.375%
- Website: northfieldmn.gov

Northfield is a city in Rice County, Minnesota, United States. A small portion lies in the adjacent Dakota County. The population was 20,790 at the 2020 census. Northfield is 40 mi (64 km) south of the downtowns of Minneapolis and St. Paul and is an exurb of the Minneapolis–St. Paul metropolitan area. It is home to two private liberal arts colleges, Carleton College and St. Olaf College.

== History ==
Southern Minnesota was first settled by the indigenous Mdewakanton and Wahpekute Dakota peoples in the late 1700s, after battling with the Ojibwe and being expelled from northern Minnesota. The Wahpekute settled in the Big Woods region, which included most of what is now Northfield and Faribault. The Wahpekute used the Cannon and Straight rivers for easy transportation and game hunting. They engaged in the burgeoning Minnesota fur trade, leading Alexander Faribault to establish a trading post in Wahpekute territory in 1826, which became the town of Faribault in 1855. In 1834, the Wahpekute tribe moved their settlement to Faribault's trading post, leading to a confluence of economic and cultural engagement.

In 1822, during a war between the Wahpekute and the Sac and Fox tribes, Wahpekute head chief Shakeska (White Nails) died and was succeeded by his son Tasagi. About 170 Wahpekute people died in conflicts with the Sac and Fox between 1815 and 1825 in southern Minnesota. By this time, the Wahpekute had become economically dependent on white settlers like those at the Faribault trading post, and suffered from the depletion of game in the area.

In 1851, the Mdewakanton and Wahpekute ceded 24,000,000 acres (97,000 km^{2}) of land to the U.S. government in the Treaty of Traverse des Sioux, in what is now considered an unequal treaty. The land the U.S. bought included what is now Northfield. Also in 1851, the two tribes signed the Treaty of Mendota, and were subsequently relocated to the newly created Lower Sioux Agency in Morton.

Northfield was platted in October 1855 by John W. North. It was founded by white settlers from New England known as "Yankees" as part of westward expansion. The town was an early agricultural center with many wheat and corn farms and supported lumber and flour mills powered by the Cannon River. As the "wheat frontier" moved west, dairy operations and diversified farms replaced wheat-based agriculture. The region has since moved away from dairy and beef operations, and it produces substantial crops of corn and soybeans, as well as hogs. The local cereal producer Malt-O-Meal is one of the few remnants of Northfield's historic wheat boom. The city's motto, "Cows, Colleges, and Community" (a recent change from "Cows, Colleges, and Contentment"), reflects the influence of the dairy farms as well as its two liberal arts colleges, Carleton College and St. Olaf College.

Since early in its history, Northfield has been a center of higher education. Carleton College (then Northfield College) was founded in 1866 by the Minnesota Conference of Congregational churches whose Congregation consisted of the "Yankee" settlers who had largely founded the town. These people descended from the English Puritans who settled New England in the 1600s. Carleton soon established its campus on the northern edge of town. St. Olaf College was founded in 1874 on the western edge of town by Norwegian Lutheran immigrant pastors and farmers who were eager to preserve their faith and culture by training teachers and preachers. These two institutions, which today enroll more than 5,000 students, make Northfield a college town.

In the 1970s, completion of Interstate 35 six miles west of Northfield enabled the expansion of the Minneapolis–Saint Paul metro area south of the Minnesota River. The downtown grain elevator accepted its last load of corn in 2000 and was torn down in 2002. Residential growth has been rapid since the mid-1990s. Northfield Hospital, which opened in 2003 in the town's northwest corner, is in Dakota County, so chosen because government reimbursement rates are more generous for Dakota County than for Rice County.

== Geography ==
According to the United States Census Bureau, the city has an area of 8.61 square miles (22.30 km^{2}); 8.56 square miles (22.17 km^{2}) is land and 0.05 square miles (0.13 km^{2}) is water. The peak elevation is about 912 ft (278 m).

The town is roughly centered around the Cannon River and rises to the east and west from it.

Interstate 35 is 6 mi (9.7 km) west of Northfield. Minnesota State Highways 3, 19, and 246 are three of Northfield's main routes.

== Demographics ==
Historical population
Census	Pop.	Note	%±
1880	2,296		—
1890	2,659		15.8%
1900	3,210		20.7%
1910	3,265		1.7%
1920	4,023		23.2%
1930	4,153		3.2%
1940	4,533		9.2%
1950	7,487		65.2%
1960	8,707		16.3%
1970	10,235		17.5%
1980	12,562		22.7%
1990	14,684		16.9%
2000	17,147		16.8%
2010	20,007		16.7%
2020	20,790		3.9%
2022 (est.)	20,924		0.6%
U.S. Decennial Census; 2020 Census

=== 2020 census ===
As of the 2020 census, Northfield had a population of 20,790. The median age was 30.9 years. 17.7% of residents were under the age of 18 and 17.2% of residents were 65 years of age or older. For every 100 females there were 85.7 males, and for every 100 females age 18 and over there were 83.1 males age 18 and over.

99.5% of residents lived in urban areas, while 0.5% lived in rural areas.

There were 6,723 households in Northfield, of which 28.7% had children under the age of 18 living in them. Of all households, 48.5% were married-couple households, 16.6% were households with a male householder and no spouse or partner present, and 29.3% were households with a female householder and no spouse or partner present. About 31.4% of all households were made up of individuals and 14.4% had someone living alone who was 65 years of age or older.

There were 7,023 housing units, of which 4.3% were vacant. The homeowner vacancy rate was 1.1% and the rental vacancy rate was 5.5%.

Racial composition as of the 2020 census
Race	Number	Percent
White	15,770	75.9%
Black or African American	635	3.1%
American Indian and Alaska Native	115	0.6%
Asian	1,034	5.0%
Native Hawaiian and Other Pacific Islander	8	0.0%
Some other race	1,880	9.0%
Two or more races	1,348	6.5%
Hispanic or Latino (of any race)	2,637	12.7%

=== 2010 census ===
As of the census of 2010, there were 20,007 people, 6,272 households, and 3,946 families living in the city. The population density was 2,337.3 inhabitants per square mile (902.4/km^{2}). There were 6,832 housing units at an average density of 798.1 per square mile (308.1/km^{2}). The racial makeup of the city was 88.8% White, 1.3% African American, 0.2% Native American, 3.5% Asian, 4.0% from other races, and 2.2% from two or more races. Hispanic or Latino of any race were 8.4% of the population.

There were 6,272 households, of which 32.8% had children under the age of 18 living with them, 50.0% were married couples living together, 9.3% had a female householder with no husband present, 3.6% had a male householder with no wife present, and 37.1% were non-families. 30.7% of all households were made up of individuals, and 13.1% had someone living alone who was 65 years of age or older. The average household size was 2.44 and the average family size was 3.04.

The median age in the city was 26.4 years. 19.8% of residents were under the age of 18; 29% were between the ages of 18 and 24; 19.1% were from 25 to 44; 20.1% were from 45 to 64; and 12% were 65 years of age or older. The gender makeup of the city was 47.4% male and 52.6% female.

=== 2000 census ===
As of the census of 2000, there were 17,147 people, 4,909 households, and 3,210 families living in the city. The population density was 2,452.2 inhabitants per square mile (946.8/km^{2}). There were 5,119 housing units at an average density of 732.1 per square mile (282.7/km^{2}). The racial makeup of the city was 92.57% White, 0.90% African American, 0.34% Native American, 2.36% Asian, 0.05% Pacific Islander, 1.78% from other races, and 1.99% from two or more races. Hispanic or Latino of any race were 5.73% of the population.

There were 4,909 households, out of which 35.4% had children under the age of 18 living with them, 52.7% were married couples living together, 9.6% had a female householder with no husband present, and 34.6% were non-families. 27.5% of all households were made up of individuals, and 9.6% had someone living alone who was 65 years of age or older. The average household size was 2.53 and the average family size was 3.08.

In the city, the population was spread out, with 20.2% under the age of 18, 32.1% from 18 to 24 (a figure heavily influenced by the student population of St. Olaf and Carleton College), 21.0% from 25 to 44, 16.1% from 45 to 64, and 10.5% who were 65 years of age or older. The median age was 23 years. For every 100 females, there were 91.3 males. For every 100 females age 18 and over, there were 87.7 males.

The median income for a household in the city was $49,972, and the median income for a family was $61,055. Males had a median income of $40,008 versus $28,456 for females. The per capita income for the city was $18,619. About 2.8% of families and 7.2% of the population were below the poverty line, including 5.3% of those under age 18 and 7.4% of those age 65 or over.

== Economy ==
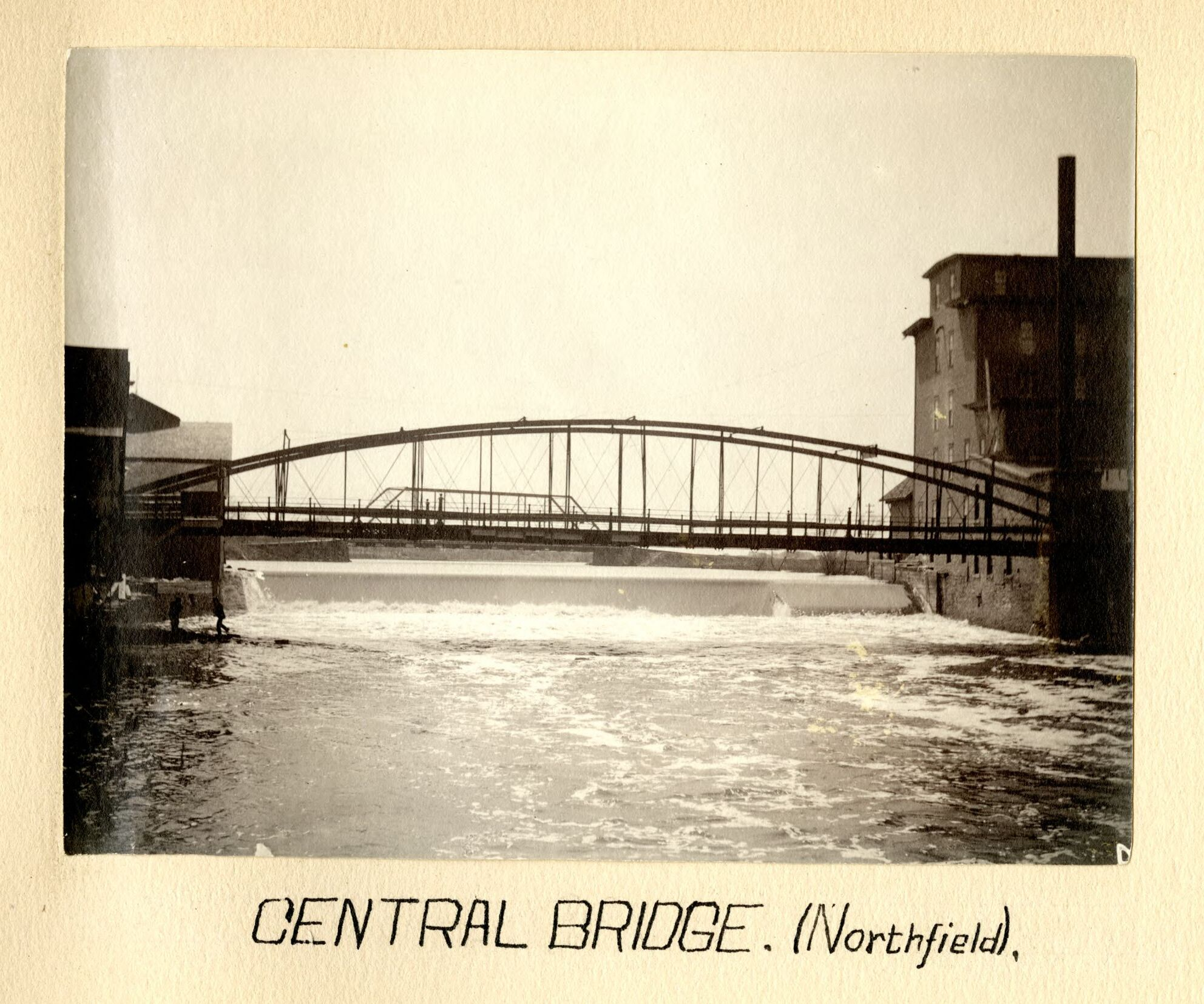
Cannon River dam by the central bridge in Northfield, from a Carleton College student photo album, 1895

Early in the city's history, local merchants created a small town square between Fourth Street to the north, Division Street to the east, the Cannon River to the west, and the southern storefronts. The old Ames Mill/Malt-O-Meal plant was also nearby, originally powered by the dam on the river. Bridge Square and the surrounding downtown area remain a strong cultural attraction for the city. The square has several amenities including a large fountain, a memorial statue, and a concession stand known as "the popcorn wagon" run by the senior center. Several scenic walkways follow the river, and numerous shops and boutiques can be found on the neighboring streets.

Businesses serving the growing senior citizen community of Northfield have expanded to include the Northfield Senior Center, the Village on the Cannon, Millstream Commons, and new construction at the Northfield Retirement Center complex. The northern edge of the city has also been expanding with several residential and commercial developments.

Jesse James' and the James-Younger Gang's 1876 attempt to rob the First National Bank of Northfield serves as a heritage tourism draw for the town. The original bank building was converted to a museum operated by the Northfield Historical Society. The First National Bank of Northfield operates from a main office built half a block away from the historic site. In its front lobby, a glass case showcases a gun used during the robbery.

The Northfield Convention and Visitors Bureau provides comprehensive tourism information and visit planning services.

In 2023, the Mercado Local marketplace opened a brick-and-mortar store in downtown Northfield, after beginning operations in 2021. The store is affiliated with Rice County Neighbors United, and was founded to support the local Hispanic community. Its intended purpose is to provide economic empowerment to immigrant vendors while simultaneously addressing local issues like housing discrimination and income inequality. In addition to providing vendor space, Mercado Local hosts financial literacy, zumba, and art classes, poetry readings, talks, and meetings of local groups.

=== Housing ===
==== Viking Terrace ====
As of 2022, Viking Terrace, a northwestern Northfield manufactured home park serving predominantly low-income families, had about 150 lots. The city government established the park in 1975. Viking Terrace is outside walking distance from local food vendors aside from Dollar General, which lacks fresh produce.

In April 2022, the park was sold for $5 million to Lakeshore Management, which imposed curfews and restricted wheelchair accessibility, vehicles, gardening, pets, clotheslines, and children's toys and games. The company threatened eviction if residents did not meet the new standards. Residents protested and refused to renew their leases. Minnesota Attorney General Keith Ellison overturned the landlord's restrictions in July 2022. He urged residents to "get organized", "complain", keep in touch with the Attorney General's office, and consider buying the property collectively.

In October 2023, Viking Terrace resident and residents' association president Jorge Zuccolotto joined a class-action lawsuit against Datacomp, the largest national provider of data on manufactured home parks. The suit alleges that Datacomp provided sensitive information on manufactured home lot rental prices, enabling landowners to fix, raise, maintain, or stabilize rents. The plaintiffs allege that this action violates the Sherman Act and resulted in manufactured home owners being overcharged for their tenancy. On May 1, 2024, Viking Terrace residents joined other Minnesota manufactured home residents at the Minnesota State Capitol to discuss rent control legislation with Ellison and state representatives Matt Norris, Sandra Feist, Kristi Pursell, and John Hoffman.

== Arts and culture ==
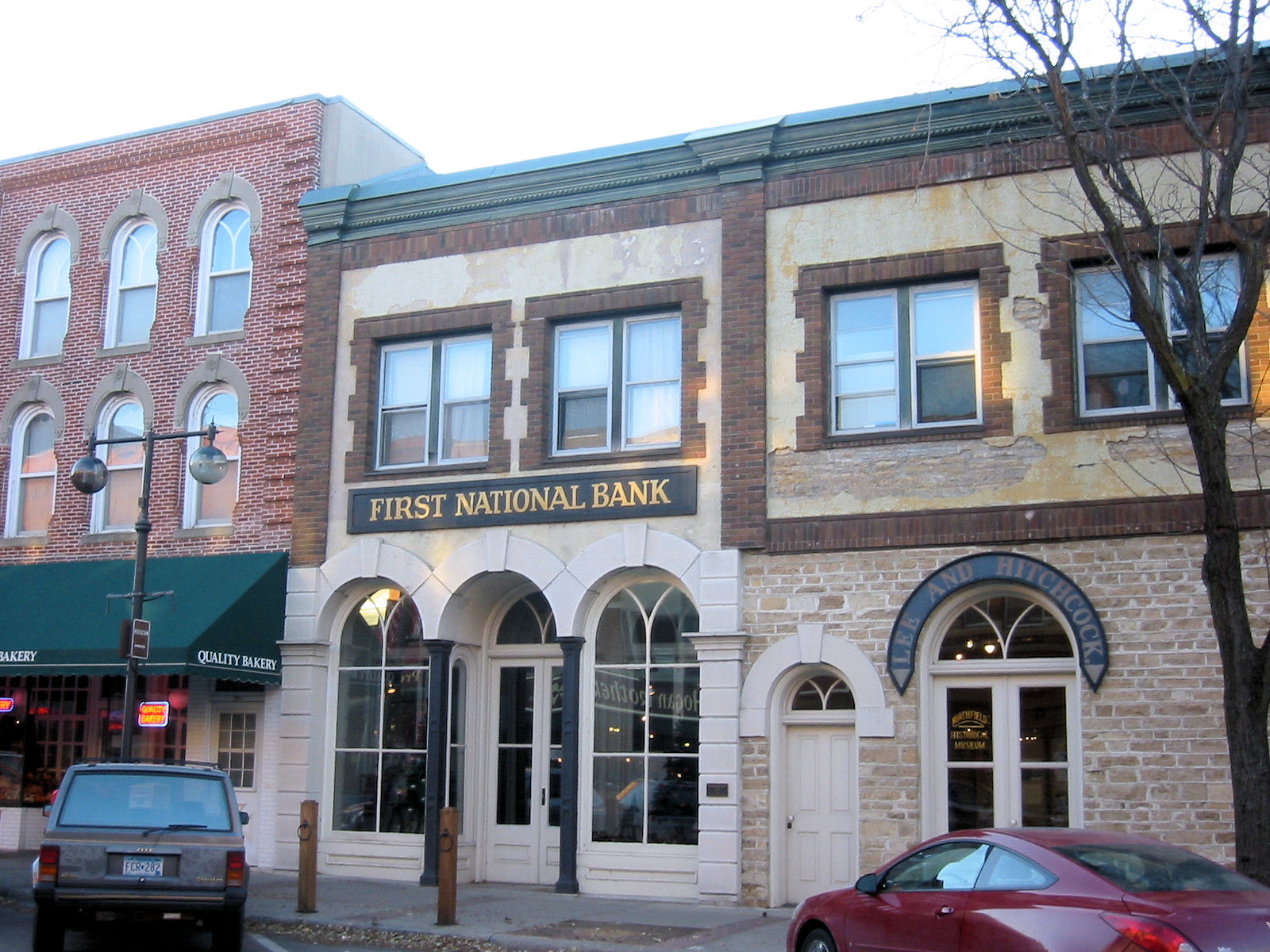
The First National Bank in the Scriver Building in Northfield, Minnesota, site of the attempted robbery

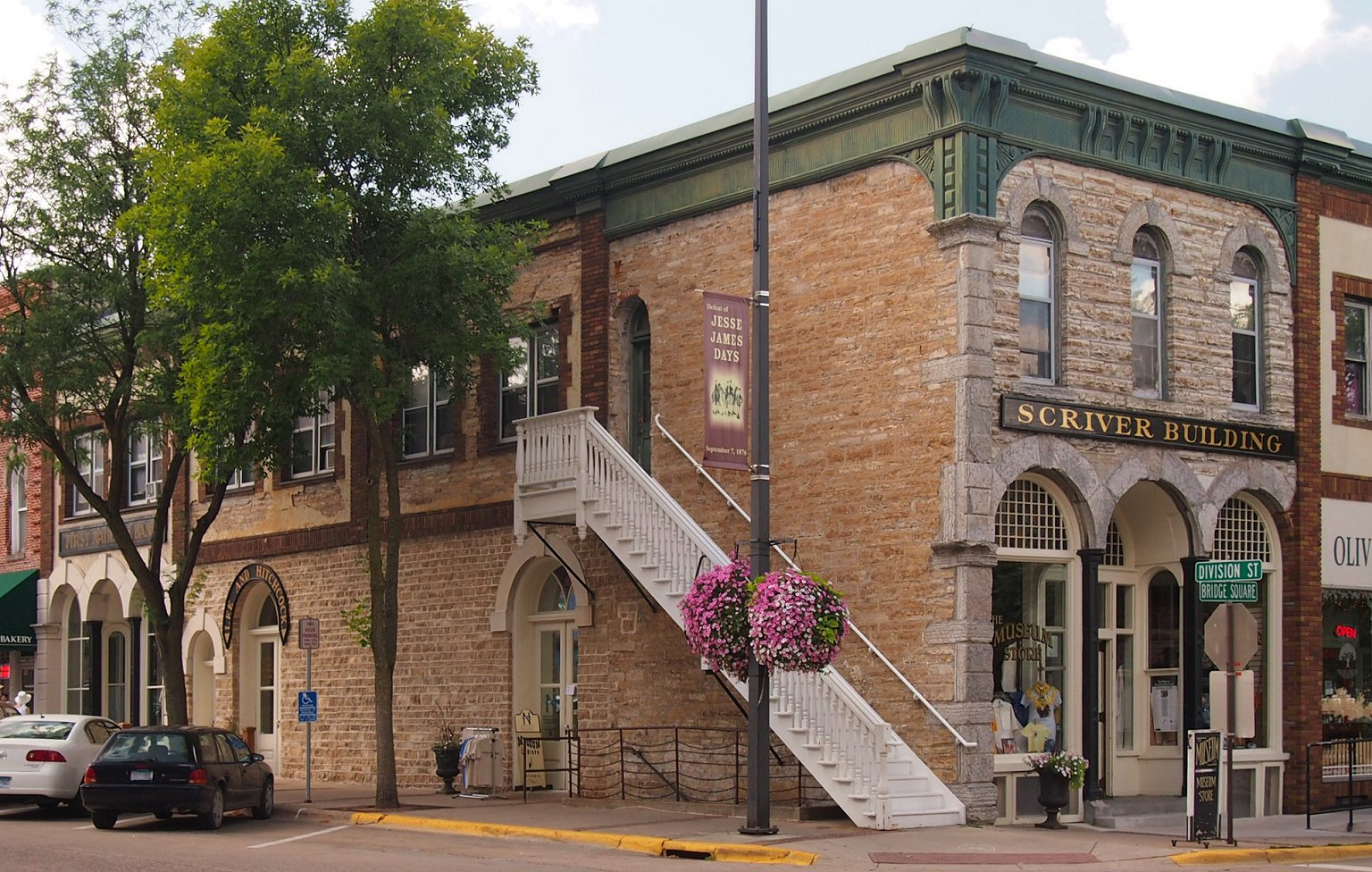
The Scriver Building in Northfield, Minnesota

On September 7, 1876, Northfield experienced one of its most important historical events, when The James-Younger Gang attempted a robbery on the First National Bank of Northfield. Local citizens, recognizing what was happening, armed themselves and resisted the robbers and successfully thwarted the theft. The gang killed the bank's cashier, Joseph Lee Heywood and a Swedish immigrant, Nicholas Gustafson. A couple of members of the gang were killed in the street, while Cole, Bob, and Jim Younger were cornered near Madelia, Minnesota. Jesse and Frank James escaped west into the Dakota Territory, while the remaining gang members were killed or taken into custody. Considering the James gang as related to postwar insurgency, the raid has sometimes been called the last major event of the American Civil War. Two popular Northfield slogans are "Jesse James Slipped Here", based on the raid's failure, and "Get your guns boys, they're robbing the bank!", which was the alarm sounded by hardware store merchant J.S. Allen that spurred Northfield men into action, arming themselves with long guns in a street shootout that lasted around seven minutes, leaving two gang members dead in the street. Bob Younger's horse was killed and Frank James assassinated First National Bank acting cashier Joseph Lee Heywood. Swedish immigrant Nicolaus Gustafson was shot in the head by Cole Younger and died of his injuries four days later. Bank teller Alonzo Bunker was shot in the shoulder as he tried to escape.

The events have become the basis of an annual outdoor heritage festival called The Defeat of Jesse James Days. It is held the weekend after Labor Day and is among the largest outdoor celebrations in Minnesota. Thousands of visitors witness reenactments of the robbery, which are staged on Division Street, outside of the First National Bank of Northfield. Other activities during the festival include a championship rodeo, carnival, car show, and parade, as well as arts and crafts expositions, and musical performances. Many food stations are set up in Bridge Square, and during the evenings live music is played in the Entertainment Center tent on Water Street. A horseshoe hunt takes place the week before the celebration: an antique horseshoe is hidden somewhere within the city on public grounds and the finder claims that year's cash purse.

== In popular media ==
- Films based on the failed raid include The True Story of Jesse James (1957), The Great Northfield Minnesota Raid (1972), and The Long Riders (1980).
- Northfield was also the setting of the TV-movie Love Always, Santa (2016).
- In the fourteenth episode of the 1979 TV series, Spider-Woman, Doctor T. transports himself into Northfield during the Bank Raid of 1876 in order to rob Jesse James.

== Parks and recreation ==
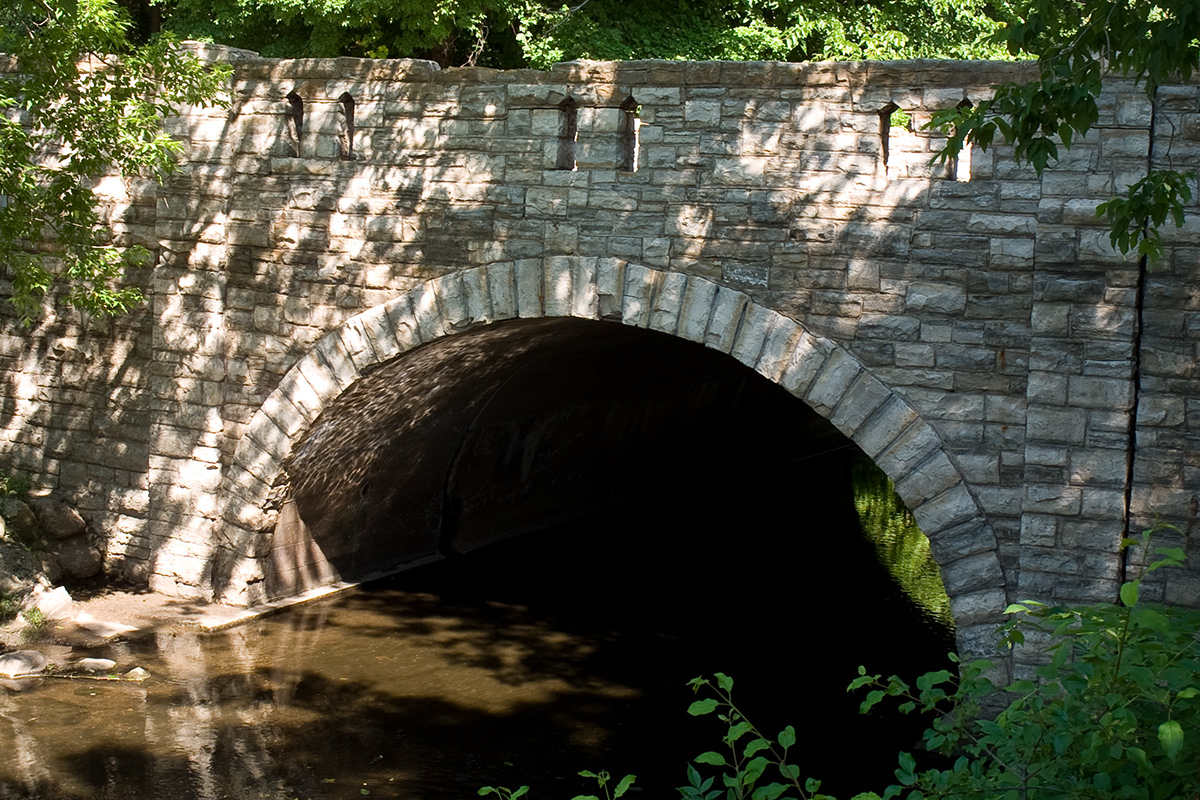
Bridge No. 8096 over Spring Creek, which runs through the Carleton College Cowling Arboretum

The city owns 35 parks consisting of over 400 acres (1.6 km^{2}) of land. Three of these parks have picnic shelters.

The Carleton College Cowling Arboretum is a well-established arboretum and nature preserve of 800 acres (3.2 km^{2}) adjacent to and owned by Carleton College. It offers extensive trails for walking in the summer and cross-country skiing in the winter.

St. Olaf College also owns around 430 acres (170 ha) called the St. Olaf Natural Lands. Of that, 150 acres (0.61 km^{2}) is restored prairie with 10 species of native grasses, and 25-40 species of wildflowers, 15 acres (0.061 km^{2}) of Big Woods habitat, and up to 9 acres (0.036 km^{2}) of surface wetlands. The St. Olaf Natural Lands are open to the public all year long and visitors are welcome to walk the trails and explore the Natural Lands.

The Mill Towns State Trail was built in 1998 as a joint effort of the cities of Northfield and Dundas.

== Government and politics ==
The City of Northfield has a mayor-council government. The City Administrator is responsible for managing daily operations. The current mayor is Erica Zweifel. The city council consists of six members, four of whom represent city districts and two of whom are at-large members serving four year terms.

Northfield is represented by Minnesota State Senator Bill Lieske (R) in District 58 and State Representative Kristi Pursell (DFL) in District 58A.

In the United States Congress, Northfield is part of Minnesota's 2nd congressional district, represented by Angie Craig (DFL) since 2019, and in the Senate by Tina Smith and Amy Klobuchar, both members of Minnesota's Democratic-Farmer-Labor Party, an affiliate of the Democratic Party.

Presidential election results

Precinct General Election Results
Year	Republican	Democratic	Third parties
2024	24.4% 2,949	72.6% 8,780	3.0% 368
2020	25.4% 2,966	72.4% 8,436	2.2% 254
2016	25.4% 2,764	66.9% 7,280	7.7% 841
2012	29.6% 3,307	67.7% 7,569	2.7% 309
2008	27.8% 3,065	70.7% 7,795	1.5% 161
2004	31.7% 3,234	67.0% 6,839	1.3% 136
2000	31.2% 2,752	59.4% 5,245	9.4% 834
1996	27.5% 2,006	65.4% 4,769	7.1% 519
1992	24.8% 1,852	57.4% 4,277	17.8% 1,329
1988	37.4% 2,601	62.6% 4,354	0.0% 0
1984	44.5% 3,029	55.5% 3,780	0.0% 0
1980	31.7% 1,841	45.1% 2,618	23.2% 1,352
1976	45.4% 2,420	51.2% 2,732	3.4% 183
1972	50.1% 2,202	48.9% 2,149	1.0% 42
1968	51.3% 1,608	46.5% 1,457	2.2% 68
1964	44.7% 1,322	55.2% 1,630	0.1% 4
1960	68.0% 2,126	31.6% 990	0.4% 12

== Education ==
Northfield is home to St. Olaf and Carleton colleges. Their student and staff populations account for a large portion of the town's year-round population.

The Northfield Public School district operates three elementary schools, a middle school, a high school, and an alternative learning center. In addition, Northfield has public charter schools: Arcadia (grades 6–12) and Prairie Creek Community School (grades K–5) in nearby Castle Rock. They receive state funding from the State of Minnesota.

== Transportation ==
Northfield is at the intersection of Minnesota State Highway 3 and Minnesota State Highway 19. The nearest interstate highway is I-35, west of the city. Northfield is also the site of one of the first roundabouts with grade-separated paths for bikes and pedestrians in the United States at the intersection of TH 246 and Jefferson Parkway.

Historically, Northfield was served by four railroads: the Chicago Great Western Railway, Milwaukee Road, the Rock Island, and the Minneapolis, Northfield and Southern Railway. Today, the freight-only Albert Lea Subdivision of the Union Pacific Railroad runs north–south through Northfield. Progressive Rail, a short-line railroad, operates several branch lines radiating from Northfield. Resumption of passenger service over the Dan Patch Corridor has been studied.

== Notable people ==
- Peter Agre (born January 30, 1949), Nobel laureate in chemistry
- Adelbert Ames (October 31, 1835 – April 13, 1933), Union Army general during the Civil War
- Cyril Archibald (1837 – April 13, 1914), member of Canadian Parliament
- Ian Barbour (October 5, 1923 – December 24, 2013), winner of 1999 Templeton Prize
- Steven Brust (born November 23, 1955), author and musician
- Mataeo Bunbury (born June 13, 2005), soccer player
- Lincoln Child (born 1957), author
- F. Melius Christiansen (April 1, 1871 – June 1, 1955), pioneer of a cappella choral music
- Raymond Cox (1951–2017), Minnesota state legislator and businessman
- Michael Dorris (January 30, 1945 – April 10, 1997), author
- Joan N. Ericksen (born 1954), United States District Court judge
- Ralph B. Goodhue (January 27, 1878 – January 18, 1960), Minnesota state senator and farmer
- Laurence McKinley Gould (August 22, 1896 – June 21, 1995), geologist, educator, polar explorer
- Joel Heatwole (August 22, 1856 – April 4, 1910), U.S. Representative
- Lucius Roy Holbrook (April 30, 1875 – October 19, 1952), U.S. Army major general
- Alexandra Holden (born April 30, 1977), actress
- Siri Hustvedt (born February 19, 1955), author, poet, and essayist
- Justin Kloos, professional hockey player
- Thomas M. Neuville (January 31, 1950 – January 26, 2022), Minnesota state senator and judge
- Grace Fallow Norton (October 29, 1876 – 1962), poet
- Karl Rolvaag (July 18, 1913 – December 20, 1990), governor of Minnesota
- Ole Edvart Rølvaag (April 22, 1876 – November 5, 1931), author
- Gilmore Schjeldahl (June 1, 1912 – March 10, 2002), inventor and entrepreneur
- Peter Schjeldahl (March 20, 1942 – October 21, 2022), art critic and writer
- Marilyn Sellars (born 1944), country music singer
- Chad Setterstrom (born June 13, 1980), professional football player
- Mark Setterstrom (born March 3, 1984), professional football player
- Edward Sövik (June 9, 1918 – May 4, 2014), architect, liturgist
- Steve Strachan (born January 26, 1965), former member of the Minnesota House of Representatives
- Caleb Thielbar (born January 31, 1987), professional baseball player
- Edward John Thye (April 26, 1896 – August 28, 1969), governor of Minnesota and U.S. Senator
- Thorstein Veblen (July 30, 1857 – August 3, 1929), economist and sociologist
- Ben Wang (born January 1, 2000), actor
- Paul Wellstone (July 21, 1944 – October 25, 2002), U.S. Senator
- Jon Wee (born 1965?), professional juggler
- Johnny Western (born October 28, 1934), singer-songwriter, actor, radio host
- Charles Augustus Wheaton (July 1, 1809 – March 14, 1882), major figure in the abolitionist movement and Underground Railroad
- Ida Belle Clary Wilcox (August 6, 1850 – January 26, 1928), missionary honored by South Africa in 2009
- Jerome J. Workman Jr. (born August 6, 1952), spectroscopist, editor, author

== Media ==
=== Radio ===
AM radio stations
Frequency	Call sign	Name	Format	Owner
1080	KYMN	95.1 The One	News/Talk & Adult Album Alternative	Northfield Radio, Inc.

FM radio stations
Frequency	Call sign	Name	Format	Owner
88.1	KRLX		Campus radio	Carleton College
89.3; 89.3 HD-2	KCMP	89.3 The Current; Local Current	Adult Album Alternative; Adult Album Alternative	Minnesota Public Radio
93.1	KSTO		Campus radio	St. Olaf College
95.1	K236CO (KYMN-AM Translator)	95.1 The One	News/Talk & Adult Album Alternative	Northfield Radio, Inc.
