= Mankato West High School =

- Mankato West Scarlets

Location
- 1351 South Riverfront Drive; Mankato, Minnesota; United States; 44.1589°N 94.01765°W

Information
- School district: Independent School District 77
- Principal: Sherri Blasing
- Teaching staff: 60.15 (FTE)
- Grades: 9–12
- Enrollment: 1,193 (2023-2024)
- Student to teacher ratio: 19.83
- Colors: Scarlet and White
- Athletics conference: Big 9 Conference
- Nickname: Scarlets
- Rival: Mankato East High School
- Newspaper: West Side Story
- Yearbook: Otaknam
- Website: whs.isd77.org

Mankato West High School is a public secondary school located in Mankato, Minnesota, United States. It is one of three high schools operated by Mankato Area Public Schools (Independent School District 77) and consists of students from the western half of the Mankato/North Mankato micropolitan area. The school has an enrollment of approximately 1,200 students.

In 1992–93 the school was designated as a "Blue Ribbon School of Excellence" by the United States Department of Education. In 2026, U.S. News & World Report ranked Mankato West High School first in Minnesota schools outside of the Twin Cities metro area and 20th overall in the state. Students ranked 37th out of 420 Minnesota schools for college readiness.

The school's teams are nicknamed the Scarlets. Mankato West is a member of the Big 9 Conference.

== Facilities ==
The school has a 1,100-seat auditorium, a fitness center, and six computer labs. In 2013, Mankato passed a $69.1 million bond issue, including $2 million to expand the school's cafeteria. In 2023 the school district passed a $105 million bond and in 2026 the school underwent renovations, such as a new gym and additional classrooms.

== Athletics ==
Mankato West High School has the following sports offerings:

- Boys and Girls Adapted Bowling
- Boys and Girls Adapted Floor Hockey
- Boys and Girls Tennis
- Boys and Girls Track and Field
- Boys Baseball
- Boys Football
- Girls volleyball
- Boys and Girls Swim and Dive
- Boys Wrestling
- Boys and Girls Alpine Skiing
- Boys and Girls Hockey
- Boys and Girls Basketball
- Boys and Girls Golf
- Boys and Girls Cross Country
- Boys and Girls Lacrosse
- Girls gymnastics

== Extracurricular ==
Mankato West High School has the following extracurricular offerings:

- Knowledge Bowl
- Theater
- VEX Robotics
- Math League
- Debate
- Speech
- 77 Lancers Marching Band

== Notable alumni and faculty ==
- Minneapolis City Council Member Aisha Chughtai, the youngest and first Muslim woman elected to the Minneapolis City Council.
- Former CEO of General Motors Daniel Akerson graduated from Mankato West High School in 1966.
- Tim Walz, 41st Governor of Minnesota and 2024 Democratic vice presidential nominee. Walz was a geography teacher and defensive coordinator for the Mankato West football when it won its first state championship in 1999.
- Gary Mielke, professional baseball player, Texas Rangers, pitcher.
- Margaret Anderson Kelliher former speaker of the house, 2010 gubernatorial candidate, former Commissioner of the Minnesota Department of Transportation, and current Director of the Minneapolis Department of Public Works.
