= Austin High School (Minnesota) =

Location
- 301 3rd St NW; Austin, Minnesota 55912; United States; 43.6683°N 92.9791°W

Information
- School type: Public High School
- Established: 1869
- School district: 492
- Superintendent: Joey Page
- Principal: Matt Schmidt
- Staff: 78.44 (FTE)
- Grades: 9–12
- Enrollment: 1,408 (2023-2024)
- Student to teacher ratio: 17.95
- Hours in school day: 7
- Colors: Scarlet and White
- Song: Austin High Gives Hail to Thee
- Fight song: AHS Fight Song; Scarlet and White
- Athletics conference: Big 9 Conference
- Mascot: Packers
- Newspaper: The Sentinel
- Yearbook: Austinian
- Feeder schools: Ellis Middle School
- Website: Austin High School

Austin High School (originally called Franklin School when constructed in 1869) is a public high school in Austin, Minnesota, United States. It is part of Austin Public Schools, established in 1857. The home of the Packers, the school has over 1,250 students. The school colors are Scarlet and White, and the sports team is the Packers. AHS is a member of the Big 9 Conference.

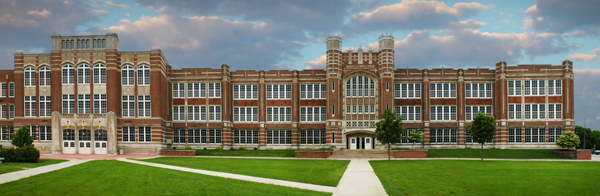
Austin High School. Shown here is the 1919 building and the main entrance to the 1939 addition, which continues to the left.

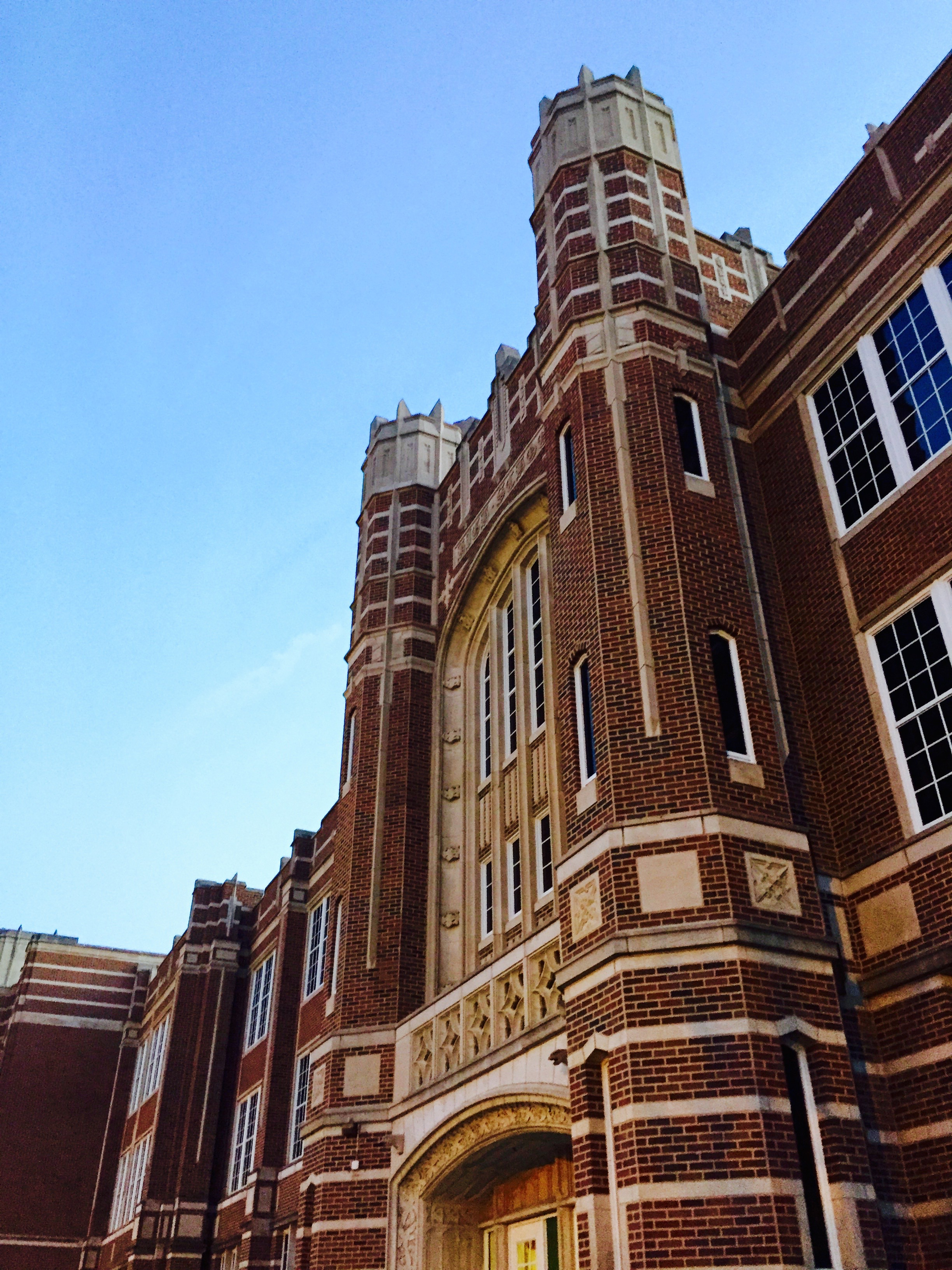
Exterior architectural detail of the school's 1911 section

== School layout ==
The original (north) block and first addition (south block) are laid out in a fashion where the classrooms all have exterior windows; the only exception being what was the original south hall of the original (north) block which currently overlooks the commons area.

The interior of the north block of the building houses the school's library/media center and the original auditorium, named Christgau Hall. The interior of the south block / first addition houses Knowlton Auditorium and Ove Berven gym. Across Fourth Street to the west of the main building, by underground walkway, is the school's Annex building. It is home to industrial arts, child care, music programs, the school's weight room and a small auditorium.

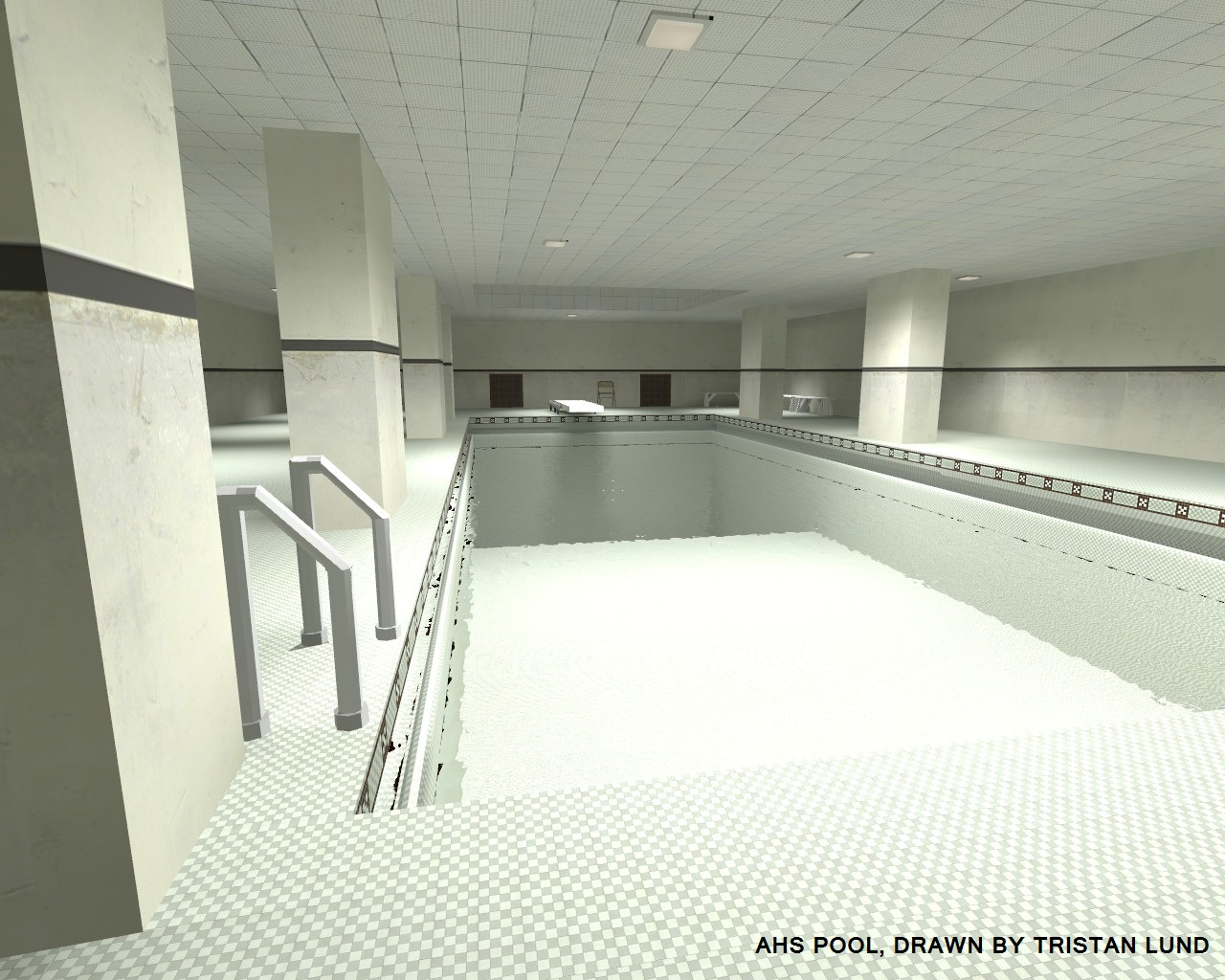
Pool

== Annex Building ==
Weight Room:

During the 2025-26 school year, the newly renovated annex weight room was revealed. The renovations, which were made possible by the Thielen Foundation, brought new equipment along with changes from the previous room. Vikings wide receiver and president of the Thielen Foundation Adam Thielen arrived to celebrate the new renovations.

Music Rooms:

The Annex received a second floor addition which houses the MacPhail Center for Music, music rooms, and tech/shop classes. Construction in winter of 2019 and was opened in the spring of 2020. The MacPhail Center for Music is not a part of AHS classrooms, though they are located in the same building.

The first floor of the Annex includes the choir room and has the 'Learning Steps' towards the MacPhail side. The second floor includes both band and orchestra rooms, along with multiple rehearsal rooms and a music library.

All three music rooms and practice rooms feature products of Wenger® Corporation, and include Wenger's VAE® Rehearsal System which helps students understand the environment where they will perform.

== Sports available ==
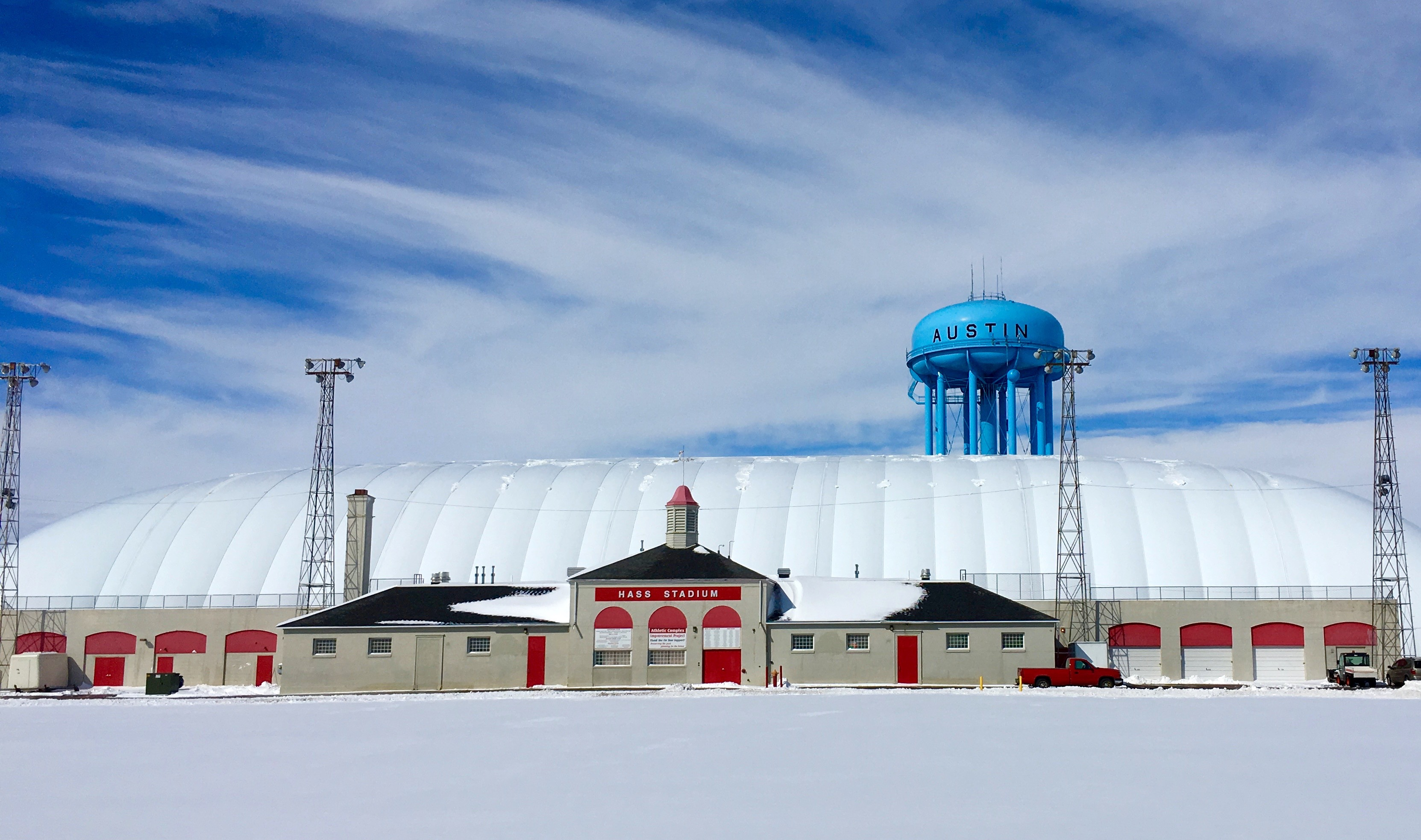
Packer Dome, a seasonal athletic facility located at Haas Stadium/Wescott Field and managed by Austin Public Schools.

- Dance Team (Girls)
- Cheer Team (Girls)
- Gymnastics (Girls)
- Softball (Girls)
- Basketball (Boys/Girls)
- Soccer (Boys/Girls)
- Tennis (Boys/Girls)
- Golf (Boys/Girls)
- Wrestling (Boys/Girls)
- Hockey (Boys/Girls)
- Bowling (Boys/Girls)
- Cross Country (Boys/Girls)
- Track and Field (Boys/Girls)
- Swimming/Diving (Boys/Girls)
- Football (Boys)
- Baseball (Boys)
- Volleyball (Boys/Girls)
- Clay Target Shooting (Co-ed)

== Clubs ==
Austin High School is home to over 100 different clubs, including:

- Theater
- Go Green Club
- Student Council
- Art Club
- STAND
- Robotics
- Austinaires and Choralaries
- La Fiera
- Jazz Band & Pep Band
- Speech and Debate

== Miscellaneous ==
On November 3, 2006, around 94 juniors assembled to perform one of the remarkable pranks of AHS history. Students, in a line, exited out door #6 (which led out Fourth Street), crossed the crosswalk, entered the Annex, then returned to the same door via tunnel to continue the 'never-ending' line of students. This resulted in a large traffic jam with cars and busses lined up along the street. Some students wore costumes which can be spotted in the viral Youtube video titled "Crosswalk Madness" by sixthhourproductions. The prank and video caught the attention of news outlets, the Minnesota Public Radio, and content creator Andy Jiang.

== Other information ==
Austin is a member of the Big Nine athletic and music conference.

== Notable alumni ==
- Grant Blackwood, novelist
- Mark Cady, jurist for the Iowa Supreme Court
- Burdette Haldorson, two-time Olympic gold medalist in men's basketball
- Amanda Hocking, New York Times best-selling author
- Molly Kate Kestner, professional singer-songwriter
- John Maus, avant-garde synthpop musician
- Bob Motzko, University of Minnesota men's ice hockey head coach
- Laurie Pryor, politician
- Warren Stowell, Minnesota state legislator, businessman, and educator
- Michael Wuertz, former Major League Baseball pitcher, previously with the Chicago Cubs and with the Oakland A's
- Rick Zombo, retired defenseman for 12 seasons in the National Hockey League
