= Craig Dahl =

American football player (born 1985)

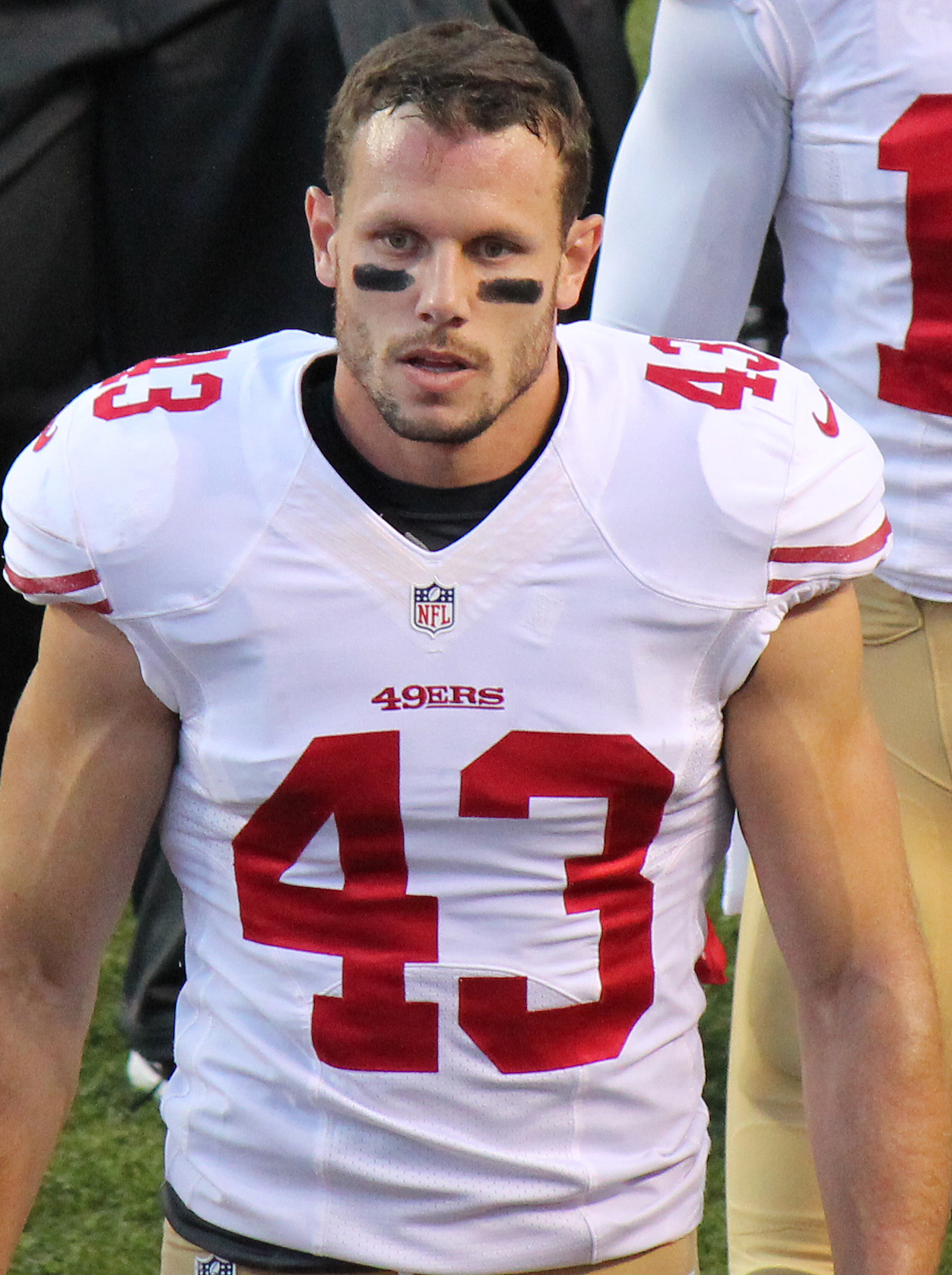
- Dahl with the San Francisco 49ers, October 2014

No. 30, 43
- Position: Safety

Personal information
- Born: June 17, 1985 (age 41); Mankato, Minnesota, U.S.
- Listed height: 6 ft 1 in (1.85 m)
- Listed weight: 207 lb (94 kg)

Career information
- High school: Mankato East (MN)
- College: North Dakota State (2003-2006)
- NFL draft: 2007: undrafted

Career history
- New York Giants (2007–2008); St. Louis Rams (2009–2012); San Francisco 49ers (2013–2014); New York Giants (2015)

Awards and highlights
- Super Bowl champion (XLII); 2× First-team All-GWFC (2004, 2006); Second-team All-GWFC (2005)

Career NFL statistics
- Total tackles: 416
- Sacks: 4.0
- Forced fumbles: 4
- Fumble recoveries: 3
- Pass deflections: 18
- Interceptions: 5
- Stats at Pro Football Reference

Craig Dahl (born June 17, 1985) is an American former professional football player and was a safety for nine seasons in the National Football League (NFL). He played college football for the North Dakota State Bison in Fargo, North Dakota and was signed by the Giants as an undrafted free agent in 2007.

He earned a Super Bowl ring during his first stint with the Giants in their Super Bowl XLII win against Tom Brady and the New England Patriots. Dahl also played for the St. Louis Rams and San Francisco 49ers.

== Education ==
Dahl was a First-team All-state, All-conference and All-city for Mankato East High School in Mankato, Minnesota. He ran for 3,398 yards and passed for 1,769 yards as a quarterback over his final two years and scored 57 touchdowns. As a junior, he quarterbacked the team to the final in the state tournament, they finished in 2nd place.

Dahl played in 43 games for the NDSU Bison and posted 238 tackles (134 solo), 8 passes defensed, 7 interceptions and two sacks. In 2006 As a senior, recorded 61 tackles (32 solo), two interceptions and a sack and was First-team All-GWFC. In 2005, he was Second-team All-Great West and had 71 tackles, an interception, forced a fumble, and blocked a kick.

He started in all 11 games at strong safety and led NDSU with 49 solo tackles including one tackle for loss and second overall with 71 total tackles and two pass breakups, one interception, a fumble recovery and one forced fumble. In 2004, as a sophomore, he started all 11 games and was named First-team All-Great West Football Conference. In 2003, he played in 10 games and had 24 tackles, and an interception and blocked a kick .

== Professional career ==
Pre-draft measurables
Height	Weight	40-yard dash	10-yard split	20-yard split	20-yard shuttle	Three-cone drill	Vertical jump	Broad jump	Bench press
6 ft 1 5/8 in (1.87 m)	216 lb (98 kg)	4.59 s	1.60 s	2.65 s	4.26 s	6.69 s	35 in (0.89 m)	10 ft 2 in (3.10 m)	17 reps
All values from NFL Combine.

=== New York Giants (first stint) ===
Dahl signed with the New York Giants after playing college football at North Dakota State University. On September 2, 2007, he was placed on the 53-man roster. Through week 12 of the 2007 season, he had three tackles and one tackle was against his home-state Vikings. On December 8, 2007, he made his first NFL start of his career against the Eagles. He had five tackles in the game. He tore his anterior cruciate ligament (ACL) in a game against the New England Patriots, and did not play again that season.

Dahl was waived by the Giants in February 2008 after failing a physical. He was re-signed on July 30, 2008, however, in the Giants' third preseason game he again tore his ACL. He was placed on injured reserve ending his season. An exclusive-rights free agent after the 2008 season, Dahl was not tendered an offer and became an unrestricted free agent in the 2009 offseason.

=== St. Louis Rams ===
Dahl was signed by the St. Louis Rams on March 17, 2009. The move reunited him with Rams head coach Steve Spagnuolo, who was the Giants' defensive coordinator during Dahl's time in New York. The Rams re-signed Dahl on March 7, 2010.

=== San Francisco 49ers ===
He signed a three-year deal with the San Francisco 49ers on March 16, 2013. He was released by the 49ers on September 4, 2015.

=== New York Giants (second stint) ===
Dahl re-signed with the New York Giants on September 7, 2015.

== NFL statistics ==
Year	Team	Games		Tackles				Fumbles			Interceptions					
Year	Team	G	GS	Comb	Total	Ast	Sack	FF	FR	Yds	Int	Yds	Avg	Lng	TD	PD
2007	NYG	9	2	19	16	3	0.0	0	0	0	0	0	0	0	0	0
2009	STL	14	8	65	57	8	2.0	0	2	0	0	0	0	0	0	3
2010	STL	15	13	98	87	11	1.0	1	1	0	2	23	11.5	23	0	6
2011	STL	16	3	61	52	9	0.0	2	0	0	1	-3	-3	-3	0	1
2012	STL	16	16	78	62	16	0.0	0	0	0	1	38	38	38	0	2
2013	SF	16	0	13	9	4	0.0	0	0	0	0	0	0	0	0	0
2014	SF	16	1	23	19	4	0.0	0	0	0	1	0	0	0	0	2
2015	NYG	15	4	44	34	10	1.0	1	0	0	0	0	0	0	0	4
Career		117	47	401	336	65	4.0	4	3	0	5	58	11.6	38	0	18
