= Albert Lea Subdivision =

The Albert Lea Subdivision or Albert Lea Sub is a railway line operated by Union Pacific Railroad in Minnesota and Iowa. It runs from Hoffman Avenue in Saint Paul, Minnesota south to Mason City, Iowa, and is a segment of the former Chicago, Rock Island and Pacific Railroad "Spine Line" which ran from the Twin Cities to Kansas City, Missouri.

In the north, the line initially runs south-southeast along the east bank of the Mississippi River until reaching the St. Paul Union Pacific Rail Bridge (known as the Hoffman Bridge in Union Pacific timetables), where it crosses the river and begins heading south-southwest. The line is primarily signaled using centralized traffic control (CTC).
