= Chad Setterstrom =

American football player (born 1980)

Profile
- Position: Guard

Personal information
- Born: June 13, 1980 (age 46); Northfield, Minnesota
- Listed height: 6 ft 3 in (1.91 m)
- Listed weight: 310 lb (141 kg)

Career information
- High school: Northfield (MN)
- College: Northern Iowa
- NFL draft: 2003: undrafted

Career history
- New Orleans Saints (2003–2006); → Amsterdam Admirals (2005); New Orleans VooDoo (2007)

Awards and highlights
- 2× All-Gateway Conference (2001, 2002)

Chad Aaron Setterstrom (born June 13, 1980) is an American former football guard. He signed with the New Orleans Saints as an undrafted rookie free agent in 2003. He played college football at Northern Iowa.

== College ==
A graduate of Northfield High School in Northfied, Minnesota, Setterstrom started 45 games at tackle at Northern Iowa, entering the lineup as a redshirt freshman in 1999. As a junior and senior he was named to the All-Gateway Conference team, and did not allow a sack in 20 of his last 23 games.

== Pro ==
Signed with the New Orleans Saints as an undrafted free agent in 2003, where he spent the next four seasons as a reserve offensive lineman. He spent the majority of his first 3 seasons on the team's practice squad and played for the Amsterdam Admirals in NFL Europe, and spent all of 2006 on injured reserve.

In 2007, Setterstrom signed with the New Orleans VooDoo of the AFL. He spent the first two weeks on the team's practice squad before being activated in week 3 and starting the final 14 games of the season.

== Personal life ==
Setterstrom is married to Sara (Freeman), and has a daughter named Elyse and a son named Anders. Chad is also the older brother of St. Louis Rams guard Mark Setterstrom. He graduated from Northern Iowa with a degree in biology education. He currently is living in Fairfield, Iowa, working as a football coach for the high school.
