= Mankato East High School =

Location
- 2600 Hoffman Road; Mankato, Minnesota 56001; United States; 44.1575°N 93.9604°W

Information
- Type: Public high school
- Motto: "Excellence, Equity, Empowerment — Every Student, Every Day."
- Established: 1973
- Principal: Akram Osman
- Teaching staff: 65.85 (FTE)
- Grades: 9–12
- Enrollment: 1,302 (2024-2025)
- Student to teacher ratio: 19.77
- Colors: Black & gold
- Mascot: Cougars
- Rival: Mankato West High School
- Website: www.ehs.isd77.org

Mankato East High School is a four-year public high school in Mankato, Minnesota, United States. The present school opened in 1973.

== Athletics ==
The Mankato East Cougars are part of the Big 9 Conference.

They have a big rivalry with Mankato West High School, one example of this is the Mankato Jug game, a football game played every year between Mankato East High School and Mankato West High School. As of the 2026-2027 school year, Mankato West currently holds the Jug and best Mankato East 42-8.

== Notable alumni ==
- Greg Orman - American businessman and politician
- Craig Dahl - an NFL football player. He earned a Championship Ring in Super Bowl XLII while playing with the New York Giants.
