= List of museums in Minnesota =

This list of museums in Minnesota encompasses museums which are defined for this context as institutions (including nonprofit organizations, government entities, and private businesses) that collect and care for objects of cultural, artistic, scientific, or historical interest and make their collections or related exhibits available for public viewing. Non-profit and university art galleries are also included.

Private museums which are not regularly open to the public and virtual museums which exist only online are not included.

== Current museums ==
Name	Image	Town/City	County	Region	Type	Summary
3M Museum		Two Harbors; 47°1′15.2″N 91°40′16.2″W	Lake	Northeast Minnesota	Industry	Honors the early days of the 3M corporation in the office building in which it was founded in 1902. Operated by 3M and the Lake County Historical Society.
3R Landmark School Museum		Lonsdale; 44°28′40.5″N 93°25′54.5″W	Rice	Southeast Minnesota	Local history	Originally built in 1908, the former two-story public schoolhouse was the old school for Independent School District #76. The first floor of this two story building is a museum; the second floor is preserved as the original school room. It is under the care of the City of Lonsdale.
Adams Area History Center		Adams; 43°33′56″N 92°43′8.5″W	Mower	Southeast Minnesota	Local history	Adams Area History Center is located in the historic First National Bank of Adams located on Main Street in Adams, Minnesota and is home to a variety of collections and research materials. Operated by the Adams Area Historical Society.
Aitkin County Depot Museum		Aitkin; 46°31′53.5″N 93°42′27.5″W	Aitkin	Northeast Minnesota	Local history	Rotating displays of Aitkin County heritage, including Mississippi riverboats and Native American culture. Housed in a 1916 train station.
Aitkin County Historical Society Log Museum		Aitkin; 46°31′53.5″N 93°42′29.5″W	Aitkin	Northeast Minnesota	Local history	Period displays of Aitkin County's pioneer days, plus early industrial and agricultural artifacts.
Akeley Paul Bunyan Historical Museum		Akeley; 47°0′13″N 94°43′50″W	Hubbard	Central Minnesota	Local history	Opened in 1984, the museum contains artifacts and photographs from Akeley's early days as home to the largest sawmill in Minnesota. Operated by the Paul Bunyan Historical Society.
Alexander Faribault House		Faribault; 44°17′27.7″N 93°16′1.5″W	Rice	Southeast Minnesota	Historic house	1853 house of fur trader and town founder Alexander Faribault, with artifacts from the Faribault family and contemporaneous settlers. Operated by the Rice County Historical Society.
Aliveo Military Museum		Red Wing; 44°33′53.5″N 92°31′59.5″W	Goodhue	Southeast Minnesota	Military	Military artifacts and relics from the Revolutionary War, Civil War, World War I, World War II, Korea, Vietnam, and the Cold War to the current Middle-East Wars.
Andrew John Volstead House		Granite Falls; 44°48′33″N 95°32′24″W	Yellow Medicine	Minnesota River Valley	Historic house	Home of U.S. Congressman Andrew Volstead from 1894 to 1930. Operated by the Granite Falls Historical Society.
Arv Hus Museum		Milan; 45°6′41″N 95°54′42″W	Chippewa	Minnesota River Valley	Local history	Features the work of Norwegian rosemalers, a mural by Augsburg artist Phillip Thompson and other local history and culture displays.
Atwater Area Historical Society and Museum		Atwater; 45°8′14″N 94°46′52″W	Kandiyohi	Minnesota River Valley	Local history	Vintage photographs and objects, plus a collection of military uniforms.
August Schell Museum of Brewing		New Ulm; 44°17′20.5″N 94°26′58″W	Brown	Minnesota River Valley	Food	History of Minnesota's oldest brewery, family-owned since 1860.
Bally Blacksmith Shop		Grand Marais; 47°45′2.5″N 90°19′58.5″W	Cook	Northeast Minnesota	Local history	Bally Blacksmith Shop, was built in 1911 and was added to the National Register of Historic Places in 1986. In 2013 the Cook County Historical Society acquired the building and operates it as a museum. Grand Marais, Minnesota, USA.
Baudette Depot Museum		Baudette; 48°42′57.5″N 94°36′0.5″W	Lake of the Woods	Northwest Minnesota	Local history	The Baudette Depot, built by the Canadian National Railways in 1923, features displays on the history of train travel and of the depot.
Bay Area Historical Society Museum and Visitor's Center		Silver Bay; 47°17′42.5″N 91°16′5″W	Lake County	Northeast	Local history	This museum and visitor center presents regional history through exhibits on the taconite industry, North Shore communities, and Lake Superior heritage, serving as an orientation point for area visitors.
BC Ness Mahnomen County History Museum		Mahnomen; 47°18′56″N 95°58′6″W	Mahnomen	Northwest Minnesota	Local history	Operated by the Mahnomen County Historical Society, the museum contains a country school, an old kitchen, and agricultural artifacts dating back to the late 1800s and early 1900s.
Becker County Museum		Detroit Lakes; 46°49′8″N 95°51′0″W	Becker	Northwest Minnesota	Local history	Museum and research library of Becker County history, operated by the Becker County Historical Society.
Beltrami County History Center		Bemidji; 47°28′3.3″N 94°52′57″W	Beltrami	Northwest Minnesota	Local history	Exhibits and archives of Beltrami County history. Operated by the Beltrami County Historical Society in a 1912 train station.
Belview Depot and School House Museums		Belview; 44°36′26″N 95°19′47″W	Redwood	Minnesota River Valley	Local history	These museums are located in two restored historic buildings that interpret the town's transportation and educational history. The 1889 schoolhouse recreates a one-room rural classroom with period desks, blackboards, maps, globes, books, a teacher's desk, stove, organ, and other donated school furnishings, while the 1883 depot serves as a local-history museum.
Benton County Museum		Sauk Rapids; 45°35′27″N 94°9′53.5″W	Benton	Central Minnesota	Local history	Exhibits and archives of Benton County history.
Bertha Museum		Bertha; 46°16′0.3″N 95°3′57.7″W	Todd	Central Minnesota	Local history	Local artifacts and memorabilia housed in a 1904 bank.
Betsy-Tacy Houses		Mankato; 44°9′20″N 94°0′25″W	Blue Earth	Minnesota River Valley	Biographical	Facing childhood homes of Maude Hart Lovelace and her best friend, fictionalized by the author in her Betsy-Tacy series. Operated by the Betsy-Tacy Society.
Big Honza's Museum of Unnatural History		Montgomery; 44°25′15.4″N 93°34′51″W	Le Sueur	Minnesota River Valley	Amusement	Humorous museum of oversized items credited to a made-up local folk hero.
Big Stone County Museum		Ortonville; 45°17′49″N 96°25′55″W	Big Stone	Minnesota River Valley	Local history	Displays of Big Stone County history, including historical buildings and an international gallery of 500 waterfowl specimens.
Blackduck History and Art Center		Blackduck; 47°43′52″N 94°32′56″W	Beltrami	Northwest Minnesota	Local history	Contains a library, a military display, and recreations of a one-room school, general store, and drug store. Established in 2006.
Blue Earth County History Center and Museum		Mankato; 44°9′39.5″N 94°0′7″W	Blue Earth	Minnesota River Valley	Local history	Exhibits on Blue Earth County history, including Dakota heritage, Mankato's classic Front Street, and author Maud Hart Lovelace. Operated by the Blue Earth County Historical Society.
B'nai Abraham Museum and Cultural Center		Virginia; 47°31′6.5″N 92°32′11″W	St. Louis	Northeast Minnesota	Ethnographic	Listed on the National Register of Historic Places the former B'nai Abraham Synagogue provides a history of Virginia's Jewish community and is local venue for summer musical and cultural events.
Bois Forte Heritage Center and Cultural Museum		Tower; 47°49′34″N 92°20′57″W	St. Louis	Northeast Minnesota	Native American	Heritage of the Bois Forte Band of Chippewa, including outdoor displays of a birchbark wigwam and a tipi.
Borgstrom House Museum		Upsala; 45°48′34.5″N 94°34′20″W	Morrison	Central Minnesota	Local history	Memorabilia of a Swedish American community—including a 1928 REO Speed Wagon firetruck—displayed in a 1913 house. Operated by the Upsala Area Historical Society.
Brandon History Center		Brandon	Douglas	West Minnesota	Local history	The History Center collects and preserves the history of Brandon, Millerville, and the surrounding area. Located in the Brandon City Hall Auditorium, it presents local history displays, photographs, artifacts, and archival materials.
Bricelyn Museum		Bricelyn; 43°33′47.5″N 93°48′49.7″W	Faribault	Minnesota River Valley	Local history	Houses collections on local history in the former First Baptist Church of Bricelyn and is maintained by the Bricelyn Area Historical Society.
Browerville Legacy Museum		Browerville	Todd	Central Minnesota	Local history	The museum focuses on preserving local history, offering a collection of artifacts, bifold displays, and articles documenting the history of Browerville, Minnesota. The museum occasionally hosting special reunions or exhibits.
Brown County Museum		New Ulm; 44°18′47″N 94°27′37″W	Brown	Minnesota River Valley	Local history	Exhibits on Brown County history, including local Century Farms, artist Wanda Gág, and the Dakota War of 1862. Operated by the Brown County Historical Society in an ornate 1910 post office.
Bunnell House		Homer; 44°1′20.3″N 91°33′34.6″W	Winona	Southeast Minnesota	Local history	1850s Carpenter Gothic house of an early settler, interpreting pioneer life; operated by the Winona County Historical Society.
Byron Area Historical Society Museum		Byron	Olmsted	Southeast Minnesota	Local history	Located in the old Byron City Hall building built in 1938 as a WPA Project, the museum contains area historic documentation and objects including records from all of Kalmar Township: Community, Religious, Business, Agriculture, Education, Local Government, Transportation, and Recreation.
Cannon Falls Historical Museum		Cannon Falls; 44°30′29.4″N 92°54′12″W	Goodhue	Southeast Minnesota	Local history	Local artifacts and research material, operated by the Cannon Falls Area Historical Society in an 1888 fire station
Canton Depot Museum		Canton; 43°31′47″N 91°55′48″W	Fillmore	Southeast Minnesota	Local history	Built in 1879 by the Caledonia, Mississippi and Western Railroad Company, the depot was added to the National Register of Historic Places in 2018.
Carlton County History and Heritage Center		Cloquet; 46°43′17″N 92°27′32″W	Carlton	Northeast Minnesota	Local history	Permanent and rotating exhibits on Carlton County history. Operated by the Carlton County Historical Society in a 1920 library.
Cass County Museum		Walker; 47°6′5″N 94°34′40″W	Cass	Central Minnesota	Local history	Displays on Cass County history, including the fur trade, lumbering, transportation, and early pioneers, plus a large collection of Ojibwe artifacts and a 1912 schoolhouse; operated by the Cass County Historical Society.
Cass Lake Museum and Lyle's Logging Camp		Cass Lake; 47°22′56″N 94°36′31″W	Cass	Central Minnesota	Industry, local history	Displays on Cass County history, including the fur trade, lumbering, transportation, and early pioneers, plus a large collection of Ojibwe artifacts and a 1912 schoolhouse; operated by the Cass County Historical Society.
Charles A. Lindbergh Historic Site		Little Falls; 45°57′35″N 94°23′13″W	Morrison	Central Minnesota	Biographical	Boyhood home of aviator Charles Lindbergh, with exhibits in an adjacent visitor center; operated by the Minnesota Historical Society within Charles A. Lindbergh State Park.
Charles A. Weyerhaeuser Memorial Museum		Little Falls; 45°57′15″N 94°23′25″W	Morrison	Central Minnesota	Local history	Permanent and rotating exhibits on Morrison County history, including Native American artifacts, local business and industry, and personal and household items; operated by the Morrison County Historical Society.
Children's Discovery Museum		Grand Rapids; 47°12′23″N 93°31′47″W	Itasca	Northeast Minnesota	Children's	Contains interactive educational exhibits and a large display of dolls. Adjacent to the Judy Garland Museum.
Children's Museum of Southern Minnesota		Mankato; 44°9′43″N 94°0′49″W	Blue Earth	Minnesota River Valley	Children's	Contains interactive exhibits
Chik-Wauk Museum and Nature Center		West Cook; 48°10′7.5″N 90°52′51″W	Cook	Northeast Minnesota	Local history	Interprets the natural and cultural history of the Gunflint Trail area. Operated by the Gunflint Trail Historical Society and Superior National Forest in a 1930s resort lodge.
Christie House Museum		Long Prairie; 45°58′26″N 94°51′51″W	Todd	Central Minnesota	Historic house	1901 Queen Anne house of an influential local family, with original furnishings and memorabilia.
Church of the Good Shepherd Museum		Blue Earth; 43°38′12″N 94°6′2″W	Faribault	Minnesota River Valley	Local history	Built in 1872 the former Episcopal church building is listed on the NRHP and is maintained by the Faribault County Historical Society for concerts, events and tours.
Clarissa Community Museum		Clarissa; 46°7′46.4″N 94°57′2″W	Todd	Central Minnesota	Local history	Museum of town's early history.
Clearwater County History Center		Shevlin; 47°31′46″N 95°15′39″W	Clearwater	Northwest Minnesota	Local history	Rotating exhibits and research collections on Clearwater County history; operated by the Clearwater County Historical Society in a 1911 school with additional historical buildings on the grounds.
Clinton Depot		Clinton; 45°27′35″N 96°26′14″W	Big Stone	Minnesota River Valley	Local history	Local memorabilia including war mementos, agricultural equipment, and railroad artifacts housed in an 1885 train station.
Cold Spring Area Historical Society Museum		Cold Spring; 45°27′21.5″N 94°25′47.5″W	Stearns	Central Minnesota	Local history	The museum maintains collection and exhibits on the surrounding area.
Comstock House		Moorhead; 46°52′8.5″N 96°46′3″W	Clay	Northwest Minnesota	Historic house	1883 Victorian house of an influential family, including politician and businessman Solomon Comstock and his daughter, pioneering female educator Ada Comstock. Managed by the Historical and Cultural Society of Clay County and the Minnesota Historical Society.
Cook County History Museum		Grand Marais; 47°44′56.5″N 90°19′58″W	Cook	Northeast Minnesota	Local history	Permanent and rotating exhibits on Cook County history, operated by the Cook County Historical Society in the Grand Marais Light keeper's house.
Cottonwood County Historical Museum		Windom; 43°51′52″N 95°7′5″W	Cottonwood	Southwest Minnesota	Local history	Displays on Cottonwood County history from precontact Native Americans to the early 20th century, plus an art gallery and research library; operated by the Cottonwood County Historical Society.
Croft Mine Historical Park		Crosby; 46°29′30″N 93°57′7″W	Crow Wing	Central Minnesota	Mining	Interprets an underground iron mine on the Cuyuna Range active 1916–1934, with original equipment and structures, vintage photographs, and guided tours of a simulated mine.
Cuyuna Range Museum		Crosby; 46°29′1″N 93°57′0.5″W	Crow Wing	Central Minnesota	Local history	Local history, history of the Cuyuna Iron Range, and area railroads. Operated by the Cuyuna Iron Range Heritage Network.
Cross River Heritage Center		Schroeder; 47°32′36.5″N 90°53′49.5″W	Cook	Northeast Minnesota	Local history	Exhibits and period rooms relating to settlement around the Cross River, plus a research archive. Operated by the Schroeder Area Historical Society in a 1929 Tudor Revival inn.
Crosslake Historic Log Village		Crosslake; 46°40′5″N 94°6′35″W	Crow Wing	Central Minnesota	Open-air	Collection of historical and replica log buildings, including several homesteader cabins, a saloon, a tourist cabin, and a 1923 town hall with local artifacts displayed inside. Operated by the Crosslake Area Historical Society.
Crow Wing County Historical Society Museum		Brainerd; 46°21′19.5″N 94°12′13″W	Crow Wing	Central Minnesota	Local history	Exhibits of Crow Wing County history, including logging, railroads, mining, and early home life, housed in a 1917 sheriff's residence/county jail.
Danube Depot Museum		Danube; 44°47′33″N 95°5′49″W	Renville	Minnesota River Valley	Local history	The museum is a preserved historic railroad depot managed by the Danube Historical Society.
Darwin Twine Ball Museum		Darwin; 45°5′47″N 94°24′36″W	Meeker	Minnesota River Valley	Novelty	Home of the biggest ball of twine wrapped by one person, measuring 13 feet (4.0 m) in diameter and 17,400 pounds (7,900 kg).
Dassel History Center & Ergot Museum		Dassel; 45°5′10.5″N 94°18′28.5″W	Meeker	Minnesota River Valley	Local history	Permanent and rotating exhibits on local contributions to agriculture and medicine—including the transformation of ergot from plague to drug—and farmer-turned-politician Magnus Johnson. Operated by the Dassel Area Historical Society in a 1937 agricultural laboratory.
Dawson Bank Museum		Dawson; 44°55′46.5″N 96°3′16″W	Lac qui Parle	Minnesota River Valley	Local history	The Dawson Bank Museum is a bank operating inside of the former First National Bank Building in Dawson, Minnesota featuring an archive and collections of local area history.
Dinehart-Holt House		Slayton; 43°59′6″N 95°45′19″W	Murray	Southwest Minnesota	Historic house	1891 Victorian house of early leading citizens of Slayton. Managed by the Murray County Historical Society.
Dodge County Historical Society Museum		Mantorville; 44°4′6.5″N 92°45′20″W	Dodge	Southeast Minnesota	Local history	Local artifacts displayed in an 1869 church, with two adjacent historical structures.
Dorothy Molter Museum		Ely; 47°54′10″N 91°50′2″W	St. Louis	Northeast Minnesota	Biographical	Museum and historic cabins dedicated to longtime wilderness resident Dorothy Molter and the heritage of the Boundary Waters.
Duluth and Iron Range Railroad Depot Museum		Two Harbors; 47°1′8″N 91°40′12″W	Lake	Northeast Minnesota	Local history	Displays on the development of Lake County, with a focus on iron mining, railroads, logging, and commercial fishing. Operated by the Lake County Historical Society in a 1907 train station.
Duluth Art Institute		Duluth; 46°46′53″N 92°6′15″W	St. Louis	Northeast Minnesota	Art	Visual arts organization dating to 1871, offering rotating exhibitions by regional artists as well as workshops at the Duluth Depot and Lincoln Branch Library.
Duluth Children's Museum		Duluth; 46°45′29″N 92°7′58.5″W	St. Louis	Northeast Minnesota	Children's	Nation's fifth-oldest children's museum, established in 1930.
Duluth Depot		Duluth; 46°46′53″N 92°6′15″W	St. Louis	Northeast Minnesota	Multiple	1892 train station housing the Duluth Art Institute, Lake Superior Railroad Museum, St. Louis County Historical Society Museum, and several performing arts organizations.
Eagle Bend Museum and Library		Eagle Bend; 46°9′54″N 95°2′9″W	Todd	Central Minnesota	Local history	Local artifacts and memorabilia, in a building shared with the Eagle Bend Public Library.
East Polk Heritage Center		Fosston; 47°34′18″N 95°44′30″W	Polk	Northwest Minnesota	Local history	Local artifacts displayed in an 1887 house and a replica log cabin, plus a restored schoolhouse.
Edna G. Tugboat		Two Harbors; 47°1′0.8″N 91°40′21.4″W	Lake	Northeast Minnesota	Maritime	Great Lakes tugboat in service 1896–1981. Operated by the Lake County Historical Society.
Ed's Museum		Wykoff; 43°42′24.8″N 92°16′5″W	Fillmore	Southeast Minnesota	Americana	Former grocery store displaying the belongings of local character and lifelong hoarder Ed Krueger, including toys, packaging, magazines, player piano rolls, and a dead cat, all willed to the city and organized by the Wykoff Progressive Club and operated by the Wykoff Area Historical Society.
Eitzen Museum		Eitzen	Houston	Southeast Minnesota	Local history	Operated by the Houston County Historical Society, the museum preserves two floors of artifacts documenting Eitzen's local history. It is housed in the 1890 stone C. Bunge Jr. Store, a National Register of Historic Places property that once served as a general store and post office.
Eli Wirtanen Pioneer Farm		Makinen; 47°18′45″N 92°14′39″W	St. Louis	Northeast Minnesota	Local History	The museum is a 40-acre farm originally homesteaded by Eli Wirtanen in 1904. A house, animal barn, hay barns, sauna, and guesthouse are on the farmstead. The home is an example of Finnish log construction.
Ely Art & Heritage Center		Ely; 47°54′42″N 91°51′40″W	St. Louis	Northeast Minnesota	Multiple	Art exhibits and historical displays, operated by Ely Greenstone Public Art within a former mining complex.
Ely–Winton History Museum		Ely; 47°54′19″N 91°50′14″W	St. Louis	Northeast Minnesota	Local history	Displays on local history, including the Ojibwe, voyageurs, logging, mining, and the Boundary Waters Canoe Area Wilderness. Housed on the campus of Vermilion Community College.
Esko Historical Society Museum		Esko; 46°42′24″N 92°21′54″W	Carlton	Northeast Minnesota	Open-air	Seven historic buildings, including an 1878 gristmill, 1897 one-room school, and Finnish-style log farm structures, plus vehicles including a horse-drawn schoolbus and a 1938 Caterpillar D8 snowplow.
End O' Line Railroad Park & Museum		Currie; 44°4′29″N 95°39′54″W	Murray	Southwest Minnesota	Open-air	Railroad and frontier life, with vintage locomotives and rolling stock, an original railway turntable, historical buildings, and a model train layout. Operated by Murray County.
Etta C. Ross Memorial Library Museum		Blue Earth; 43°38′18.3″N 94°5′54.4″W	Faribault	Minnesota River Valley	Local history	Local records and artifacts housed in a 1904 library. Operated by the Faribault County Historical Society.
Eugene Saint Julien Cox House		St. Peter; 44°19′56.5″N 93°57′42″W	Nicollet	Minnesota River Valley	Historic house	Restored 1871 Italianate house of a founder and early leader of St. Peter. Operated by the Nicollet County Historical Society.
Evansville Historical Foundation		Evansville; 46°0′15″N 95°41′1″W	Douglas	West Minnesota	Open-air	Historical and replica buildings, including two 19th-century houses, a country schoolhouse, 1892 log cabin, a sod house, pioneer church, and a town hall, with some indoor exhibits and a research library.
Fagen Fighters WWII Museum		Granite Falls; 44°45′7″N 95°33′28″W	Yellow Medicine	Minnesota River Valley	Military	Celebrates the veterans of World War II with a collection of fully operational military aircraft and vehicles, plus murals, statues, and other art.
Fairfax Historical Depot Museum		Fairfax	Renville	Minnesota River Valley	Local history	Housed in Fairfax's 1883 Minneapolis and St. Louis Railroad depot, the museum preserves a National Register landmark and shares the community's local history. Its displays include artifacts and interpretive materials related to the railroad and Fairfax area heritage.
Farmamerica		Waseca; 44°4′56″N 93°37′2″W	Waseca	Southeast Minnesota	Agriculture	Minnesota's agricultural heritage, featuring an 1850s farm, 1930s farm, visitor center, antique tractors and machinery, and several historical buildings. Also known as the Minnesota Agricultural Interpretive Center.
Fillmore County History Center Museum		Fountain; 43°44′18″N 92°8′15″W	Fillmore	Southeast Minnesota	Local history	Artifacts from Fillmore County history, including agricultural equipment, women's and children's clothing, period displays, two Bernard Pietenpol airplanes, and a one-room schoolhouse. Operated by the Fillmore County Historical Society.
Finland Minnesota Heritage Site		Finland; 47°24′7″N 91°11′49″W	Lake	Northeast Minnesota	Open-air	Exhibits and historical structures interpreting the pioneer heritage of eastern Lake County. Operated by the Finland Minnesota Historical Society on an 1890s homestead.
Finn Creek Open Air Museum		New York Mills; 46°27′16″N 95°19′55″W	Otter Tail	West Minnesota	Open-air	Local Finnish American heritage represented by original and relocated structures on a 1900 farmstead, including a smoke sauna, sawmill, and town hall.
Fish House & Tug the Neegee		Grand Marais; 47°44′52″N 90°20′33″W	Cook	Northeast Minnesota	Maritime	Replica 1930s fish house and drydocked 35-foot (11 m) fishing tug built 1935–36. Operated by the Cook County Historical Society in partnership with the City of Grand Marais.
Fishing Hall of Fame of Minnesota		Baxter; 46°21′27″N 94°14′52″W	Crow Wing	Central Minnesota	Sports	Photos and memorabilia commemorating individuals and corporations significant in the development of recreational fishing in Minnesota. Operated by a non-profit organization within a Gander Mountain store.
Fitger's Brewery Museum		Duluth; 46°47′33″N 92°5′25″W	St. Louis	Northeast Minnesota	Food	Memorabilia of Minnesota's most successful brewery, in operation 1881–1972. Housed within the historic brewery complex, which is now a mall.
Fond du Lac Reservation Cultural Center and Museum		Cloquet; 46°42′49″N 92°30′51″W	Carlton	Northeast Minnesota	Native American	Fond du Lac Cultural Center & Museum has several examples of Ojibwe cultural artifacts, arts & crafts, and traditional home life.
Forest City Stockade		Forest City; 45°11′44″N 94°27′47″W	Meeker	Minnesota River Valley	Local history, open-air	Reconstruction of a stockade built during the Dakota War of 1862, with a two-story museum and replica pioneer buildings.
Forest History Center		Grand Rapids; 47°13′47″N 93°33′54″W	Itasca	Northeast Minnesota	Industry	Human history of Minnesota's forests, interpreted via a visitor center, early-20th-century logging camp, 1930s U.S. Forest Service station, nature trails, and environmental programs. Operated by the Minnesota Historical Society.
Fort Belmont		Jackson; 43°38′13″N 95°0′17″W	Jackson	Southwest Minnesota	Military	Recreated 1860s pioneer fort, plus other historic and replica structures including a sod house, blacksmith shop, farmhouse, and 1902 church. Indoor exhibits feature historical vehicles, early music boxes, and dolls.
Fort Ridgely		Fairfax; 44°27′11″N 94°44′4″W	Nicollet	Minnesota River Valley	Military	Indoor exhibits in a reconstructed building and foundation ruins of a frontier U.S. Army fort in service 1853–1867, site of the Battle of Fort Ridgely in 1862. Operated by the Minnesota Historical Society.
Freeborn County Historical Museum		Albert Lea; 43°39′35.5″N 93°21′35.5″W	Freeborn	Southeast Minnesota	Local history	History of Freeborn County, with period displays and a 19th-century pioneer village.
Friesen Historic Site		Clara City; 44°57′8″N 95°18′37″W	Chippewa	Minnesota River Valley	Local history	This historic site preserves an early pioneer farmstead and home associated with Friesen ancestry, featuring a two-story brick schoolhouse from 1893 housing artifacts, photographs, and documents on local Mennonite settlement and rural life.
Fulda Depot Museum		Fulda; 43°52′10″N 95°36′3″W	Murray	Southwest Minnesota	Local history	A historic site and museum that preserves the legacy of the town's railroad era. The museum operates in the former Chicago, Milwaukee, St. Paul, and Pacific Depot. Listed on the National Register it is the only surviving Eastlake-style two-story railroad depot in southwestern Minnesota.
Gammelgården Museum of Scandia		Scandia; 45°15′6″N 92°48′28″W	Washington	Central Minnesota	Ethnic	Interprets Swedish immigration to Minnesota, particularly in the years 1850–1880, through historical buildings and artifacts.
George Stoppel Farmstead		Rochester; 44°0′29″N 92°30′36″W	Olmsted	Southeast Minnesota	Local history	The farmstead is composed of the main house, barn, smokehouse and several hand-dug caves. The farmstead was added to the National Register of Historic Places in 1976 and was acquired 1976–1978 by the History Center of Olmsted County.
Giants of the Earth Heritage Center		Spring Grove; 43°33′38″N 91°38′18″W	Houston	Southeast Minnesota	Ethnic	Local memorabilia and archival material. Offers genealogical and genetic genealogy research assistance.
Giiwedinong Treaty Rights and Culture Museum		Park Rapids; 46°55′17″N 95°3′32″W	Hubbard	Central Minnesota	Native American	Indigenous-led museum to the lands, waters, cultures, treaty rights, and art of the Northern Midwest. Opened in 2023 in a former library.
Gilfillan Estate		Morgan; 44°27′46″N 94°59′40″W	Redwood	Minnesota River Valley	Agriculture, historic house	Large 1882 farm with an ornate farmhouse, outbuildings, and antique machinery. Operated by the Redwood County Historical Society.
Glensheen Historic Estate		Duluth; 46°48′54.5″N 92°3′6.5″W	St. Louis	Northeast Minnesota	Historic house	39-room mansion built 1905–08 for entrepreneur Chester Congdon, with much of its original contents and furnishings. Operated by the University of Minnesota Duluth.
Goodhue Area Historical Museum		Goodhue; 44°24′9″N 92°37′20″W	Goodhue	Southeast Minnesota	Local history	Preserves area heritage through artifacts, archives, and exhibits on pioneer settlement, Norwegian immigration, farming evolution, small-town commerce, and 20th-century community life.
Goodhue County History Center		Red Wing; 44°33′33″N 92°32′36.7″W	Goodhue	Southeast Minnesota	Local history	Permanent and temporary exhibits on Goodhue County history, including Native Americans, natural history, daily life, and special events. Operated by Minnesota's oldest county historical society, established in 1869.
Grand Portage National Monument		Grand Portage; 47°57′45″N 89°41′5″W	Cook	Northeast Minnesota	History	Reconstructed North West Company trading post and modern visitor center interpreting Ojibwe heritage and the North American fur trade. Operated by the National Park Service.
Grant County Museum and Veterans' Memorial Hall		Elbow Lake; 45°59′38.3″N 95°58′33″W	Grant	West Minnesota	Local history	Displays of Grant County history, including paleontology, Native American and pioneer artifacts, and military memorabilia, plus a restored log cabin and one-room school. Operated by the Grant County Historical Society.
Great Lakes Aquarium		Duluth; 46°46′44.5″N 92°6′0″W	St. Louis	Northeast Minnesota	Aquarium	Aquarium displaying freshwater species from the Great Lakes region and the Amazon River, including birds and otters, plus exhibits on physical sciences.
Green Giant Museum		Blue Earth; 43°39′5″N 94°5′45″W	Faribault	Minnesota River Valley	Industry	Largest collection of Jolly Green Giant memorabilia in the world. History of the canning factory.
Gregorius and Mary Hanka Farmstead		Embarrass Township	St. Louis	Northeast Minnesota	Open-air	The Gregorius and Mary Hanka Farmstead is a historic Finnish American farm in Embarrass Township, St. Louis County, Minnesota. It was established around 1910 by Finnish immigrants Gregorius Hanka and Mary Stierna Hanka. The farm shows how immigrant families cleared northern Minnesota's logged-over land and built productive farms.
Greyhound Bus Museum		Hibbing; 47°26′18″N 92°56′22″W	St. Louis	Northeast Minnesota	Transportation	Origins of Greyhound Lines, a local enterprise that grew into the world's largest bus company. Features 17 vintage buses including the founders' original 1914 Hupmobile.
Haehn Museum		St. Joseph; 45°33′47″N 94°19′15″W	Stearns	Central Minnesota	Religious	Exhibits on the history and influence of the Sisters of the Order of Saint Benedict, with 4,000 artifacts dating back as far as 1857. Part of Saint Benedict's Monastery.
Harkin Store		West Newton; 44°23′13″N 94°35′56″W	Nicollet	Minnesota River Valley	History	1870s general store with much of its original merchandise on display. Operated by the Minnesota Historical Society.
Headwaters Science Center		Bemidji; 47°28′20″N 94°52′54″W	Beltrami	Northwest Minnesota	Science	Science and technology exhibits with an emphasis on hands-on activities for all ages.
Henning Landmark Center		Henning; 46°19′18″N 95°26′43″W	Otter Tail	West Minnesota	Local history	Its museum space features exhibits on regional history and preserves the building's history as a hub for rural healthcare, while its gallery and meeting areas accommodate changing art displays, community events, and educational programs.
Heritage Acres Agricultural Interpretive Center		Fairmont; 43°39′26″N 94°28′25″W	Martin	West Minnesota	Local history	Established in the mid-1970s, the center functions as a living farm village featuring historic buildings, period farm equipment, and demonstrations reflecting agricultural practices from approximately one hundred years ago.
Heritage House Victorian Museum		Rochester; 44°1′34″N 92°27′53.5″W	Olmsted	Southeast Minnesota	Historic house	1875 wood-frame house which was moved to Central Park and restored.
Heritage and Windpower Learning Center of Southwestern Minnesota		Lake Benton; 44°15′38.2″N 96°17′16.5″W	Lincoln	Southwest Minnesota	Industry, local history	Exhibits on local history and wind power, a major resource in the Buffalo Ridge area.
Heritage Village		East Grand Forks; 47°56′41″N 97°1′0″W	Polk	Northwest Minnesota	Open-air	Historical and replica buildings, with tours and living history demonstrations.
Hermantown History Center		Hermantown; 46°48′29″N 92°14′2″W	St. Louis	Northeast Minnesota	Local history	Housed in the city's first city hall building, the museum features local history exhibits including a Veterans Hall, recreation of an Ice Cream Parlor and a historical display on the city's Jackson Project Homes, "subsistence homesteads" that were built in 1937 as part of Franklin Roosevelt's New Deal.
Herreid Military Museum		Luverne; 43°39′24.5″N 96°12′24.5″W	Rock	Southwest Minnesota	Military history	Focus on the military histories of the men and women from Rock County and the surrounding region.
Hewitt Public School Museum		Hewitt; 46°19′39.7″N 95°5′2.5″W	Todd	Central Minnesota	Local history	Local artifacts and memorabilia housed in a 1911 school building promoting the history of the City of Hewitt and Stowe Prairie Township. Operated by the Hewitt Historical Society.
Hibbing Historical Museum		Hibbing; 47°25′24″N 92°56′14″W	St. Louis	Northeast Minnesota	Local history	Permanent and rotating exhibits of city history, including scale models of Hibbing in 1893 and 1913, a fully furnished replica house, and logging and mining displays.
Hill-Annex Mine State Park		Marble; 47°20′9″N 93°16′1″W	Itasca	Northeast Minnesota	Mining	Tours of an open-pit iron mine active 1913–1978, with exhibits and period rooms in a former clubhouse building. Operated by the Minnesota Department of Natural Resources.
Hillstrom Museum of Art		St. Peter; 44°19′28″N 93°58′14″W	Nicollet	Minnesota River Valley	Art	Permanent and rotating displays of international, national, regional, student, and faculty art. Part of Gustavus Adolphus College.
Hinckley Fire Museum		Hinckley; 46°0′54″N 92°56′36″W	Pine	Northeast Minnesota	Local history	Interprets the devastating Great Hinckley Fire of 1894 and the subsequent rebuilding of the town and conversion from lumber to agriculture. Housed in an 1895 train station.
Hinkly House Museum		Luverne; 43°39′21.5″N 96°12′35.5″W	Rock	Southwest Minnesota	Local history	A restored Victorian mansion built in 1892 by R.B. Hinkly, a prominent local businessman and one of Luverne's founders. Owned and operated by the Rock County Historical Society.
Historic Chippewa City		Montevideo; 44°56′23″N 95°43′38″W	Chippewa	Minnesota River Valley	Open-air	Replica of a late-19th-century village with 24 buildings, including log cabins, a church, shops, and a one-room schoolhouse. Operated by the Chippewa County Historical Society.
Historic Forestville		Preston; 43°38′34″N 92°12′54″W	Fillmore	Southeast Minnesota	Living history	Living history demonstrations themed to 1899 in and around an original general store, attached residence, farm buildings, gardens, and bridge. Operated by the Minnesota Historical Society within Forestville/Mystery Cave State Park.
History Center of Olmsted County		Rochester; 44°0′23″N 92°30′36″W	Olmsted	Southeast Minnesota	Local history	The history center maintains interpretive exhibits detailing history of Olmsted County, and operates a research library. Its campus includes the George Stoppel Farmstead and other pioneer buildings.
History Museum of East Otter Tail County		Perham; 46°35′44″N 95°34′14″W	Otter Tail	West Minnesota	Local history	Displays on local domestic, economic, and social life, including Native American artifacts, the Otter Tail River, area towns, quilting, and the early tourist trade. Housed in an 1887 stone church and operated by the History, Arts & Cultural Association of East Otter Tail County.
Hjemkomst Center		Moorhead; 46°52′40″N 96°46′43″W	Clay	Northwest Minnesota	Local history	Exhibits on Clay County history, plus full-size replicas of Norway's Hopperstad Stave Church and the Gokstad ship. Operated by the Historical and Cultural Society of Clay County.
Hormel Historic Home		Austin; 43°40′13″N 92°58′37″W	Mower	Southeast Minnesota	Local history	Period displays, artifacts, and photographs of the Hormel family in original 1871 home. Also an event center and sponsor of arts activities including annual concert series and piano competition.
Houston County Historical Society Museum		Caledonia; 43°38′3″N 91°29′4″W	Houston	Southeast Minnesota	Local history, open-air	Local history collections including farm equipment and photographs, plus historic buildings on the grounds including an 1862 church, 1878 one-room schoolhouse, and 1880 log cabin.
Hubbard County Historical Museum		Park Rapids; 46°55′11″N 95°3′53.5″W	Hubbard	Central Minnesota	Local history	Period rooms—such as a Victorian parlor and one-room schoolhouse—and exhibits of local artifacts like vintage clothing, military memorabilia, and communication equipment displayed in a 1900 county courthouse.
Inga Geving Museum		Thief River Falls; 48°6′31″N 96°11′19″W	Pennington	Northwest Minnesota	Local history	Operated by the Pennington County Historical Society, the museum is housed on the grounds near the Peder Engelstad Pioneer Village and features exhibits on local county history.
International Owl Center		Houston; 43°45′47″N 91°34′03″W	Houston	Southeast Minnesota	Natural history	The International Owl Center is an education center dedicated to owls, and is home to the International Festival of Owls.
International Wolf Center		Ely; 47°54′21″N 91°49′40″W	St. Louis	Northeast Minnesota	Natural history	Education and research facility dedicated to wolves, with exhibits, programs, and a 1.25-acre (0.51 ha) habitat with live wolves.
Iron Range Historical Society Research Museum		McKinley; 47°30′43.33″N 92°24′39.28″W	St. Louis	Northeast Minnesota	Local history	Archive of local history materials, including photographs and law enforcement accessories. Housed in the WPA-built City Hall in McKinley, Minnesota.
Itasca Heritage Center		Grand Rapids 47°14′3″N 93°31′44″W	Itasca	Northeast Minnesota	Local history	Operated by the Itasca County Historical Society, includes exhibits about the woolly mammoth, Judy Garland and the Gumm family, paper industry, Native Americans, pioneers
In Their Own Words		Perham; 46°35′55.89″N 95°34′53.68″W	Otter Tail	West Minnesota	Military	Interactive exhibits and oral histories of soldiers, prisoners of war and the effects of war on communities.
Jackson County Historical Museum		Lakefield; 43°40′41″N 95°10′30″W	Jackson	Southwest Minnesota	Local history	Operated by the Jackson County Historical Society
Jasper Museum		Jasper; 43°51′0″N 96°23′49.2″W	Rock	Southwest Minnesota	Local history	A local history museum owned and operated by the Jasper Area Historical Society and located in the historic Poorbaugh Building since 1981. It features exhibits of the local history of the area.
Jeffers Petroglyphs		Comfrey; 44°5′26″N 95°3′28.5″W	Cottonwood	Southwest Minnesota	Native American	Rock outcrop bearing some 4,000 Native American petroglyphs carved in a period spanning 7,000 to 250 years ago, plus a visitor center with exhibits. Operated by the Minnesota Historical Society.
John Lind House		New Ulm; 44°18′44.5″N 94°27′42.5″W	Brown	Minnesota River Valley	Local history	Former home of Governor John Lind, the 14th Governor of Minnesota and the first Swedish-born American to serve in the U.S. Congress.
Johnson Heritage Post Art Gallery		Grand Marais; 47°44′58.5″N 90°20′8″W	Cook	Northeast Minnesota	Art	Gallery featuring the art of settler Anna Johnson (1881–1944), plus rotating exhibits of local, regional, and national artists. Operated by the Cook County Historical Society.
Joseph R. Brown Minnesota River Center		Henderson; 47°44′58.5″N 90°20′8″W	Sibley	Minnesota River Valley	Local history	Displays include a replica tipi and 1850s land office, and a topographical map of the Minnesota River, plus exhibits on town founder Joseph R. Brown and riverboats. Housed in an 1879 courthouse.
J.R. Watkins House		Plainview; 44°10′0.4″N 92°10′12.8″W	Wabasha	Southeast Minnesota	Historic house	Home from 1868 to 1885 of J.R. Watkins, founder of what is now Watkins Incorporated. Displays include period furnishings and Watkins' early products.
Judy Garland Museum		Grand Rapids; 47°12′21.8″N 93°31′47″W	Itasca	Northeast Minnesota	Biographical	Childhood home of actress and singer Judy Garland, displaying memorabilia from her life and the film The Wizard of Oz.
Kanabec History Center		Mora; 45°52′27″N 93°18′28″W	Kanabec	Northeast Minnesota	Local history	Indoor and outdoor displays, including an Ojibwe wigwam, 1906 kitchen, telecommunications gear, several historic schoolhouses, a replica 1904 fire hall, and a 1950s caboose.
Kandiyohi County Museum		Willmar; 45°7′37″N 95°2′11″W	Kandiyohi	Minnesota River Valley	Local history	Local history displays in a former train station, plus an 1880 schoolhouse, 1893 farmhouse, and a 1923 steam locomotive.
Karpeles Manuscript Library Duluth Museum		Duluth; 46°47′46″N 92°5′15″W	St. Louis	Northeast Minnesota	History	Rotating exhibits in a 1912 church building, one of 14 national locations of the world's largest private collection of notable manuscripts and documents.
Kashubian Cultural Institute & Polish Museum		Winona; 44°3′2.7″N 91°37′40.8″W	Winona	Southeast Minnesota	Ethnic	Preserves and interprets the 150-year history of Kashubian Americans. Housed in an 1890 office building.
Kensington Historical Museum		Kensington; 46°46′37″N 95°41′41″W	Douglas	West Minnesota	Local history	Displays and research material on local history, including the discovery of the Kensington Runestone and purported Viking exploration of North America. Operated by the Kensington Area Heritage Society.
Kittson County History Center and Museum		Lake Bronson; 48°44′6″N 96°39′36″W	Kittson	Northwest Minnesota	Local history	Displays of pioneer artifacts, machinery, and antique vehicles, plus historic structures including a log cabin, schoolhouse, church, and caboose. Operated by the Kittson County Historical Society.
Knife River Heritage & Cultural Center		Knife River	Lake	Northeast Minnesota	Local history & Maritime	The museum preserves and interprets local history in a historic depot. Its collection includes the restored 1939 fish tug Crusader II and the historic Leif Erikson Viking ship.
Knute Nelson House		Alexandria; 45°52′41″N 95°21′59.5″W	Douglas	West Minnesota	Historic house	Home of Norwegian American politician Knute Nelson (1843–1923), Minnesota's only foreign-born governor, who later served 28 years as a U.S. Senator. Operated by the Douglas County Historical Society.
Koochiching County and Bronko Nagurski Museum		International Falls; 48°36′12″N 93°24′31″W	Koochiching	Northeast Minnesota	Local history, sports	Displays on the area's Native American, fur trade, and economic history, plus an annex devoted to early NFL star Bronko Nagurski.
Kremer House Library and Museum		Minnesota Lake; 43°50′34″N 93°49′58″W	Faribault	Minnesota River Valley	Historic house	1902 Queen Anne house with local historical items and a library.
La Crescent History Center and Apple Museum		La Crescent; 43°49′35″N 91°18′20″W	Houston	Southeast Minnesota	Local history	Located in a former house, the museum contains historic items from the community and the area's apple industry. Operated by the La Crescent Area Historical Society.
Lac qui Parle History Center		Madison; 45°0′23″N 96°11′45″W	Lac qui Parle	Minnesota River Valley	Open-air	Museum complex with local history displays, a 3,000-piece salt and pepper shaker collection, and farm equipment, plus an 1870s log cabin, 1880s schoolhouse, 1933 gas station, and the writing study of Minnesota poet laureate Robert Bly. Operated by the Lac qui Parle Historical Society.
Lac qui Parle Mission		Montevideo; 45°1′25.5″N 95°52′5.4″W	Chippewa	Minnesota River Valley	History	Reconstructed 1835 mission where the first Dakota language dictionary and Bible were compiled. Operated by the Chippewa County Historical Society.
Lake Crystal Museum		Lake Crystal; 44°6′24″N 94°13′8.3″W	Blue Earth	Minnesota River Valley	Local history	A small local history museum operated by the Lake Crystal Area Historical Society that shares stories, artifacts, and images from the City of Lake Crystal and surrounding area in Blue Earth County, MN.
Lake of the Woods County Museum		Baudette; 48°42′40″N 94°35′8″W	Lake of the Woods	Northwest Minnesota	Local history	Displays on county topics ranging from natural history to tourism, including the Baudette Fire of 1910, plus a collection of agricultural equipment and replica buildings such as a homestead, general store, and blacksmith shop. Operated by the Lake of the Woods County Historical Society.
Lake Park Area Historical Society Museum		Lake Park; 46°49′8″N 95°51′0″W	Becker	Northwest Minnesota	Local history	Museum holds artifacts, photographs, books, documents, and related materials that record the history of the community and surrounding area. Its collections support exhibits and research on local families, schools, businesses, and civic life.
Lake Superior Railroad Museum		Duluth; 46°46′53″N 92°6′14″W	St. Louis	Northeast Minnesota	Railroad	Displays a large collection of locomotives, rolling stock, and other railroad equipment, plus regional history exhibits. Housed in the Duluth Depot and offering excursions on the North Shore Scenic Railroad.
Lake Superior Maritime Visitor Center		Duluth; 46°46′47.5″N 92°5′32.5″W	St. Louis	Northeast Minnesota	Maritime	Interprets the shipping heritage on the upper Great Lakes, with scale and full-size model ships and exhibits on the Duluth Ship Canal and Aerial Lift Bridge. Operated by the U.S. Army Corps of Engineers.
Lanesboro Historical Museum		Lanesboro; 43°43′14″N 91°58′38″W	Fillmore	Southeast Minnesota	Local history	Displays of local history and artifacts and an oral history phone booth.
Laura Ingalls Wilder Museum		Walnut Grove; 44°13′27″N 95°28′20″W	Redwood	Minnesota River Valley	Biographical	History of Laura Ingalls Wilder and her family in Walnut Grove with historical and replica buildings, plus memorabilia from stars of the Little House on the Prairie TV series and a 250-item doll collection.
Legacy of the Lakes Museum		Alexandria; 45°53′24.5″N 95°22′45.7″W	Douglas	West Minnesota	Maritime	The museum opened in 2004, and moved to their current site in 2006, building an expansion in 2008. The museum features exhibits on the regional heritage of elegant lake resorts, boating, and fishing.
Le Sueur County Historical Society Museum		Elysian; 44°12′3.5″N 93°40′26″W	Le Sueur	Minnesota River Valley	Local history	Local history exhibits including Green Giant, veterinary medicine, agriculture, art, military service, and early buildings like schools, a post office, and a drug store. Operated by the Le Sueur County Historical Society in a former school.
Lincoln County Pioneer Museum		Hendricks; 44°30′19″N 96°25′57″W	Lincoln	Southwest Minnesota	Open-air	Interprets pioneer history in the late-19th and early-20th century, with four historical buildings—a train station, school, church, and house—plus exhibits on topics like military service, agriculture, and sports.
Linden Hill Historical Event Center		Little Falls; 45°58′15″N 94°21′59″W	Morrison	Central Minnesota	Historic house	Tours of Weyerhaeuser mansion tell the stories of the Musser and Weyerhaeuser families and the history of Little Falls' lumbering era.
Lower Sioux Agency Interpretive Center		Sherman Township; 44°31′36″N 94°57′31″W	Redwood	Minnesota River Valley	Native American	History center and open-air museum on Dakota life before, during, and after the Dakota War of 1862. Co-managed by the Lower Sioux Indian Reservation and the Minnesota Historical Society.
Lund–Hoel House		Canby; 44°42′42″N 96°16′22″W	Yellow Medicine	Minnesota River Valley	Historic house	Eclectic Victorian mansion—built in 1891 and expanded in 1900—belonging to a colorful land speculator, mayor, and bank president.
Lyon County Museum		Marshall; 44°26′54.5″N 95°47′21.5″W	Lyon	Southwest Minnesota	Local history	History of Lyon County from its original Dakota inhabitants onward, including a 1950s soda fountain counter and exhibits on the pop culture of the 1960s. Operated by the Lyon County Historical Society.
Mantorville Log House		Mantorville; 44°4′3.2″N 92°45′18.2″W	Dodge	Southeast Minnesota	Historic house	The building was the cooper for the historic brewery in Mantorville. Displays feature the cooper's tools and brewery items. The upper floors are furnished in mid-1800's.
Marshall Area Fine Arts Council		Marshall; 44°26′53.3″N 95°47′22.7″W	Lyon	Southwest Minnesota	Art	Gallery with changing exhibits showcasing established and emerging regional artists.
Martin County Historical Society Pioneer Museum		Fairmont; 43°39′6″N 94°27′32.5″W	Martin	Southwest Minnesota	Local history	Permanent and changing exhibits of county history, including Fairmont Railway Motors, local music, early vehicles, pioneer housewares, fashions, and military mementos.
Maynard History Museum		Maynard; 44°54′27″N 95°28′10.3″W	Chippewa	Minnesota River Valley	Local history	Maynard History Museum, listed on the National Register of Historic Places as the Maynard State Bank.
Dr. William W. Mayo House		Le Sueur; 44°27′43.7″N 93°54′54″W	Le Sueur	Minnesota River Valley	Historic house	1859 house owned successively by Mayo Clinic founder William Worrall Mayo and three generations of the Cosgrove family who founded Green Giant. Managed by the Ney Nature Center.
Mayowood		Rochester; 43°59′28″N 92°31′19″W	Olmsted	Southeast Minnesota	Historic house	The 23,000-square foot, thirty-eight room mansion was built in 1911 by Dr. Charlie and Edith Mayo. Now 10 acres, it was once a 3,300-acre country estate, the mansion has seen many changes over the years. Mayowood is filled with furnishings from two generations of the Mayo family's extensive travels. Owned by Mayo Clinic with tours conducted by the History Center of Olmsted County.
McIntosh Heritage & Arts Center		McIntosh; 47°38′9″N 95°53′19″W	Polk	Northwest Minnesota	Local history	Local history resources and artwork.
McLeod County Museum & Gallery		Hutchinson; 44°53′38.5″N 94°23′47″W	McLeod	Minnesota River Valley	Local history	Displays on the history of McLeod County's nine communities, rotating exhibits, woodcarvings celebrating pioneer women, and the artwork of wildlife painter Les Kouba. Operated by the McLeod County Historical Society.
Meeker County Historical Society Museum and G.A.R. Hall		Litchfield; 45°7′45″N 94°31′35″W	Meeker	Minnesota River Valley	Local history	Museum containing Native American and pioneer artifacts and an 1868 log cabin, attached to an 1885 Grand Army of the Republic hall with period furnishings and Civil War memorabilia.
Melrose Area Museum		Melrose; 45°40′20.5″N 94°48′23.5″W	Stearns	Central Minnesota	Local history	Memorabilia of the area's military, business, domestic, sports, and religious history, plus a large photographic collection. Housed in a 1953 convent.
Menahga Area Historical Museum		Menahga; 46°44′59″N 95°5′39″W	Wadena	Central Minnesota	Local history	Their exhibits include, tools and equipment in logging and farming from the late 1800s to early 1900s, replicas of an early 1900s kitchen, parlor, and school setting. They also have a restored 1925 Ford Model T.
Milaca Museum		Milaca; 45°45′15″N 93°39′3″W	Mille Lacs	Northeast Minnesota	Local history	Housed in the former WPA constructed Milaca City Hall, the museum offers local history displays and maintains an archive and library of local history documents. Operated by the Milaca Area Historical Society.
Mille Lacs County Historical Society Depot Museum		Princeton; 45°34′10″N 93°35′17″W	Mille Lacs	Northeast Minnesota	Railroad	Preserved buildings and vehicles including a 1902 train station, 1856 schoolhouse, 1924 firetruck, and various train cars.
Mille Lacs Indian Museum and Trading Post		Onamia; 46°10′36″N 93°45′21″W	Mille Lacs	Northeast Minnesota	Native American	Exhibits on the history, handicrafts, and contemporary life of the Mille Lacs Band of Ojibwe, with a restored 1930s trading post. Jointly operated by the band and the Minnesota Historical Society.
Mille Lacs Lake Historical Society Museum		Isle; 45°34′10″N 93°35′17″W	Mille Lacs	Northeast Minnesota	Local History	The Mille Lacs Lake Historical Society Museum, run by volunteers, showcases the history of the Mille Lacs Lake area, including fur trading, farming, and pioneer settlements.
Millersburg Schoolhouse Museum		Millersburg; 44°25′38.3″N 93°19′39.7″W	Rice	Southeast Minnesota	Education	Restored one-room schoolhouse. Operated by the Christdala Church Preservation and Cemetery Association.
Milwaukee Road Heritage Center		Montevideo; 44°56′29.5″N 95°43′21.5″W	Chippewa	Minnesota River Valley	Railroad	Heritage of the Milwaukee Road railway in western Minnesota, with variety of rolling stock, a 1901 depot, 1913 turntable, and a model train layout depicting the year 1953.
Minnesota Amateur Baseball Hall of Fame Museum		St. Cloud; 45°33′43″N 94°9′23″W	Stearns	Central Minnesota	Sports	Memorabilia from Minnesota's numerous minor league, town, school, and club baseball teams. Housed in the River's Edge Convention Center.
Minnesota Discovery Center		Chisholm; 47°28′43″N 92°53′46″W	St. Louis	Northeast Minnesota	Mining	Exhibits on Iron Range industry, immigration, geology, and local-born governor Rudy Perpich, plus trolley tours of an open-pit mine, historic and replica buildings, and a research library. Formerly Ironworld Discovery Center.
Minnesota Fishing Museum		Little Falls; 45°58′39″N 94°22′25″W	Morrison	Central Minnesota	Sports	Minnesota's fishing heritage interpreted through dioramas, a freshwater aquarium, and 10,000 artifacts including fishing tackle through the years and antique boat motors.
Minnesota's Machinery Museum		Hanley Falls; 44°41′31″N 95°37′10″W	Yellow Medicine	Minnesota River Valley	Agriculture	Interprets rural life with a collection of tractors, farm implements, gas engines, automobiles, railroad memorabilia, and folk art housed in five buildings of a former school.
Minnesota Marine Art Museum		Winona; 44°3′34.5″N 91°39′27″W	Winona	Southeast Minnesota	Art	Art museum specializing in works inspired by water, from traditional marine art to contemporary art, including paintings by Emanuel Leutze, Winslow Homer, Pablo Picasso, and Georgia O'Keeffe.
Minnesota Military & Veterans Museum		Little Falls; 46°4′51″N 94°20′51″W	Morrison	Central Minnesota	Military	Interprets Minnesota's military history from its frontier forts to the present, and the experiences of Minnesotans in all branches of service. Also features a public Archive and Library. On the grounds of Camp Ripley.
Minnesota Museum of Mining		Chisholm; 47°29′20″N 92°53′28″W	St. Louis	Northeast Minnesota	Mining	15-acre (6.1 ha) museum to the mining industry of the Iron Range and its workers, with indoor exhibits, original heavy equipment, a rock and mineral collection, a replica town, and a simulated underground mine.
Minnesota Music Hall of Fame		New Ulm; 44°18′47.5″N 94°27′42″W	Brown	Minnesota River Valley	Music	Memorabilia and photographs honoring major contributors to Minnesota's music scenes, including Bob Dylan, Prince, Whoopee John Wilfahrt, Harold Loeffelmacher, the Andrews Sisters, Judy Garland, as well as ethnic music like polka.
Minnesota State Public School Orphanage Museum		Owatonna; 44°5′22″N 93°14′18″W	Steele	Southeast Minnesota	History	Exhibit hall and campus tours of Minnesota's only state-run orphanage, home to over 10,000 children from 1886 to 1945.
Mitson House Museum		Canton; 43°31′56.7″N 91°55′48″W	Fillmore	Southeast Minnesota	Local history	Built in 1882, the former residence is now serves as a museum for the Canton Historical Society.
Morristown Feed Mill Museum		Morristown; 44°13′43.4″N 93°26′25.5″W	Rice	Southeast Minnesota	Local history	The Morristown Feed Mill Museum, listed on the NRHP, offers a unique glimpse into agricultural history through its preserved mill and exhibits on the milling process and its impact on the community. Operated by the Morristown Historical Society.
Moose Lake Agate and Geological Center		Moose Lake; 46°26′9″N 92°44′10″W	Carlton	Northeast Minnesota	Geology	Exhibit hall on Lake Superior agates (the state gemstone) and the geology of Minnesota. Operated by the Minnesota Department of Natural Resources in Moose Lake State Park.
Moose Lake Area Historical Society and Fires of 1918 Museum		Moose Lake; 46°27′14″N 92°46′7″W	Carlton	Northeast Minnesota	Local history	1907 train station and adjacent building housing permanent and rotating exhibits, including the 1918 Cloquet Fire, railroads, a 1920s kitchen, local church memorabilia, and vintage clothing.
Mountain Lake Heritage Village		Mountain Lake; 43°56′6″N 94°55′5″W	Cottonwood	Southwest Minnesota	Local history	Buildings and items relating to homes, churches, schools, agriculture, and various other businesses.
Mower County Historical Society		Austin; 43°39′38″N 92°59′25″W	Mower	Southeast Minnesota	Open-air	Historic buildings—including a one-room schoolhouse and the original 1892 home of Hormel—plus indoor exhibits and a research library.
Murray County Historical Museum		Slayton; 43°59′1″N 95°45′22″W	Murray	Southwest Minnesota	Local history	Maintains a 10,000-strong collection of local heritage items, including vital records, antique agricultural equipment like a Caterpillar Sixty, and an 1872 log cabin.
National Eagle Center		Wabasha; 44°23′3″N 92°1′53″W	Wabasha	Southeast Minnesota	Natural history	Live rehabilitated eagles and eagle, wildlife, and conservation exhibits
Nibi Washkesh Deer Creek Museum		Deer Creek; 46°23′27″N 95°19′17.5″W	Otter Tail	West Minnesota	Local history	Operating since 1999, the museum is currently located in the building that was the original Deer Creek Fire Hall built in 1906 and features displays on local history.
Nisswa History Center and Pioneer Village		Nisswa; 46°31′20″N 94°17′26″W	Crow Wing	Central Minnesota	Open-air	Buildings and gardens representing local life at the turn of the 20th century, plus a restored train station and caboose. Operated by the Nisswa Area Historical Society.
Nelimark Homestead Museum		Embarrass; 47°39′45″N 92°11′48″W	St. Louis	Northeast Minnesota	Open-air	Operated by SISU Heritage, the site includes historic log buildings and displays on the area's Finnish American heritage.
Nemeth Art Center		Park Rapids; 46°55′11″N 95°3′53.5″W	Hubbard	Central Minnesota	Art	Displays a permanent collection of 42 European paintings dating back to the 16th century, plus seasonal exhibits of contemporary art. Housed in the former Hubbard County Courthouse.
New York Mills Regional Cultural Center		New York Mills; 46°31′7.2″N 95°22′32″W	Otter Tail	West Minnesota	Art	Rural art and culture center, changing art exhibits, and the Great American Think-Off.
Nobles County Heritage Center		Worthington; 43°37′18″N 95°35′18″W	Nobles	Southwest Minnesota	Local history	Operated by the Nobles County Historical Society, it is housed in the former Nobles County Armory Building and features a research center as well as a permanent and variety of temporary exhibits and maintains a collections of documents, manuscripts, photographs and three-dimensional objects.
Nobles County Pioneer Village		Worthington; 43°38′12″N 95°36′30″W	Nobles	Southwest Minnesota	Open-air	Pioneer Village contains roughly 40 restored and replicated structures reflecting aspects of life from the late 1800s to the early 1900s. Included are churches, a bank, general store, rural schoolhouse, hospital, railroad depot, caboose, saloon and several houses, offices and trade shops. Operated by the Nobles County Historical Society.
North Beltrami Heritage Center		Kelliher; 47°56′33.5″N 94°26′53″W	Beltrami	Northwest Minnesota	Local history	North Beltrami Heritage Center was established in 2000 and is located in the city's Old Auditorium building. In addition to displays the Heritage Center has a sculpture garden that was added along the north side and east end of the building incorporating historical farming equipment, scrap-metal sculptures created by local students.
North American Bear Center		Ely; 47°53′55″N 91°53′15″W	St. Louis	Northeast Minnesota	Natural history	Exhibits on the natural history of North American bears and North Woods wildlife, with live American black bears in a 2.5-acre (1 ha) natural enclosure.
North Shore Commercial Fishing Museum		Tofte; 47°34′34″N 90°49′53.5″W	Cook	Northeast Minnesota	Industry, maritime	Exhibits celebrating the people and technology that established commercial fishing on the harsh North Shore of Lake Superior. Operated by the Tofte Historical Society.
Northfield Historical Society Museum		Northfield; 44°27′21″N 93°9′37.5″W	Rice	Southeast Minnesota	Local history	Housed in the last bank Jesse James tried to rob.
M.T. Gunderson Home		Kenyon; 44°16′18″N 92°59′41″W	Goodhue	Southeast Minnesota	Local history	The house museum serves as the location of the Kenyon Area Historical Society. The house is fully furnished from the time period when the house was built in 1895.
Old Country School House Museum		Lake Park	Becker	Northwest Minnesota	Local history	A former school building that now supports local history education through its preserved classroom setting and related records. Within the schoolhouse, are antique desks on display as well as past photos of the students who attended the school. Operated by the Lake Park Area Historical Society.
Old Home Town Museum		Stephen; 48°26′59.5″N 96°52′47.5″W	Marshall	Northwest Minnesota	Local history	A 1916 foursquare house, early farm tools, a replica stagecoach, and a doll collection.
Oronoco Area History Center		Oronoco	Olmsted	Southeast Minnesota	Local history	The History Center preserves and shares the history of Oronoco and the surrounding area from the City Hall and Community Center building. Its resources include family and church histories, obituaries, census and cemetery records, historic newspapers and photographs, and interpretive displays.
Osakis Area Heritage Center		Osakis; 45°52′5.5″N 95°9′7″W	Douglas	West Minnesota	Local history	Collection includes family and county histories, maps, photographs, and newspapers.
Otter Tail County Historical Museum		Fergus Falls; 46°17′3″N 96°5′44″W	Otter Tail	West Minnesota	Local history	Exhibits include dioramas and period rooms featuring area natural history, Native Americans, European settlement, agriculture and farm life, and a recreation of a 1910s Main Street.
Ottesen Museum		Mankato	Blue Earth	Minnesota River Valley	Religious	Ottesen Museum is the official museum of the Evangelical Lutheran Synod. It houses a collection of artifacts and photos concerning the history of the Evangelical Lutheran Synod and its predecessor synod, the Norwegian Synod. Operated by the Evangelical Lutheran Synod Historical Society.
Owatonna Arts Center		Owatonna; 44°5′22″N 93°14′20″W	Steele	Southeast Minnesota	Art	Located on the campus of the Minnesota State Public School for Dependent and Neglected Children (see separate entry above)
Paynesville Area Museum		Paynesville; 45°22′53″N 94°42′12″W	Stearns	Central Minnesota	Local history	Two buildings with local history displays plus two restored buildings: an old country school and a church. Operated by the Paynesville Area Historical Society.
Pequot Lakes Area Historical Society Museum		Pequot Lakes; 46°36′13″N 94°18′51″W	Crow Wing	Central Minnesota	Local history	The museum is located on the lower level of the historic Cole Memorial Building. Museum exhibits are lifestyle memorabilia from the early 1930s to 1940s. Exhibits also showcase different site buildings including an old schoolhouse, a general store, and an old theater. A military section that contains past artifacts from both the First and Second World Wars is also exhibited.
Peder Engelstad Pioneer Village		Thief River Falls; 48°6′31″N 96°11′19″W	Pennington	Northwest Minnesota	Open-air	Operated by the Pennington County Historical Society, replica early 20th century village including two railroad depots, one-room schoolhouse, church, log houses, general store, two-story Victorian house, blacksmith shop and barber shop.
Peterson Station Museum		Peterson; 43°47′11″N 91°49′57″W	Fillmore	Southeast Minnesota	Local history	Local artifacts and research material in an 1877 train station, relocated from abandoned rail line (now part of the Root River State Trail) to Mill Street, the village's main thoroughfare
Phelps Mill		Underwood; 46°22′50″N 95°49′14″W	Otter Tail	West Minnesota	Industry	Turn-of-the-20th-century flour mill is open for seasonal self-guided tours.
Pickwick Mill		Pickwick; 43°58′49.4″N 91°29′48.2″W	Winona	Southeast Minnesota	Industry	Built from 1856 to 1858 it is one of the oldest flour mills found in southeast Minnesota. It is open for tours from May to October.
Pine County History Museum		Askov; 46°11′20″N 92°46′59″W	Pine	Northeast Minnesota	Local history	Operated by the Pine County Historical Society the museum and is housed in a former high school building. They operate the Little Mermaid Cafe within the building. The museum collections include five pump organs and a wooden 1982 Mercury Grand Marquis. The museum includes a library containing biographies of Pine County residents, and township records.
Pine Island Area History Center		Pine Island; 44°12′22″N 92°38′47.5″W	Goodhue	Southeast Minnesota	Local history	Operated by the Pine Island Historical Society
Pine River Depot Museum		Pine River; 46°43′1.8″N 94°24′14.5″W	Cass County	Central Minnesota	Local history	Built in 1895 as a railroad depot, and listed on the National Register of Historic Places in 2001, the museum tells the story of the greater Pine River area. Operated by the Heritage Group North, Inc.
Pipestone County Museum		Pipestone; 44°0′0.2″N 96°19′3″W	Pipestone	Southwest Minnesota	Local history	Exhibits on local firefighting, railroad, and World War I history. Operated by the Pipestone County Historical Society in a former city hall, with a circa-1880 one-room schoolhouse off-site.
Pipestone National Monument		Pipestone; 44°0′48″N 96°19′31″W	Pipestone	Southwest Minnesota	Native American	Site where many Native American tribes have long quarried catlinite for ceremonial pipes, with interpretive trails, indoor exhibits, and live demonstrations by native craftspeople. Operated by the National Park Service.
Plainview Area History Center		Plainview; 44°9′51.5″N 92°10′18″W	Wabasha	Southeast Minnesota	Local history	Housed in a former church
Polaris Experience Center		Roseau; 48°50′41″N 95°46′9″W	Roseau	Northwest Minnesota	Industry	The 5,600 square foot Polaris Experience Center offers exhibits such as the second snowmobile ever made in 1956 and activities for visitors to learn more about the company, Polaris Industries (manufacturer of snowmobiles, ATVs, motorbikes and other vehicles), its history, and its growth throughout the years.
Polk County Museum		Crookston; 47°45′55″N 96°35′47″W	Polk	Northwest Minnesota	Open-air	Operated by the Polk County Historical Society, includes museum with period room displays, household items, general store, doctor's office, barbershop, communications center (telephone and switchboard center), an 1870 log house, two room prairie house, blacksmith shop, a one-room school house and a church
Pope County Museum & History Center		Glenwood; 45°38′31″N 95°23′10″W	Pope	West Minnesota	Local history	Operated by the Pope County Historical Society
Pottery Museum of Red Wing		Red Wing; 44°33′47.5″N 92°33′31″W	Goodhue	Southeast Minnesota	Pottery	Examples of Red Wing Pottery, operated by the Red Wing Collectors Society Foundation. Housed in Pottery Place Annex, Red Wing, MN.
Prairie Village		Ada; 47°17′44″N 96°31′40″W	Norman	Northwest Minnesota	Open-air	Operated by the Norman County Minnesota Historical Society, 12 historic buildings that tell the story of the county's beginning
Preston Depot Museum & Riverfront Center		Preston; 43°40′14″N 92°4′46″W	Fillmore	Southeast Minnesota	Open-air	A history museum and community hub along the Root River State Trail, preserving railroad and regional history through interactive exhibits, artifacts, a 1902 Milwaukee Elevator Co. grain building, a restored 1939 Milwaukee Road boxcar and a 1951 caboose, and space for gatherings, meetings, and events.
Prospect House & Civil War Museum		Battle Lake; 46°17′8″N 95°42′53″W	Otter Tail	West Minnesota	House museum	Built in 1882 the house museum features the Civil War Museum in the lower level.
Probstfield Farm		Moorhead; 46°55′19″N 96°45′12″W	Clay	Northwest Minnesota	Local history	Probstfield Farm is the site of the oldest standing home in the Red River Valley. The farm features several historic buildings, working antique tractors and machinery.
Proctor Area Historical Society Museum		Proctor; 46°44′33″N 92°13′29″W	St. Louis	Northeast Minnesota	Local history	The museum building originally was the Duluth, Missabe and Northern Railway car shop superintendent's office and was moved from the Proctor railyard to its current location in 2011. The museum features the Proctor area and its railroad history with rotating historical exhibits and a scale model of the Duluth, Missabe and Iron Range Railway.
Rapidan Area Museum		Rapidan; 44°5′39″N 94°4′6″W	Blue Earth County	Minnesota River Valley	Local history	The 5,000-square-foot museum is housed in the former St. John Lutheran Church built in 1951. The museum features eight exhibits showcasing the local history of the area. Additionally, the museum offers a versatile "Heritage Hall" utilized for various programs and meetings.
Rapidan Depot Museum		Rapidan; 44°5′39″N 94°4′9″W	Blue Earth County	Minnesota River Valley	Local history	Located in a Milwaukee depot building. Built in 1906, the building consists of three rooms—waiting, office and freight room. The building was moved in 1958 to a nearby farm and used for storage until it was moved back to Rapidan in May 2002 and restorated by the Rapidan Heritage Society for use as their museum.
Raptor Ridge Museum		Spicer; 45°17′36″N 94°52′47″W	Kandiyohi	Minnesota River Valley	Natural history	Private collection of Native American artifacts, dinosaur bones and fossils, seashells, butterflies, rocks and minerals
Red River History Museum		Shelly; 47°27′29″N 96°48′59″W	Norman	Northwest Minnesota	Local history	Includes 3 working looms, exhibits on local doctors, schools, military uniforms and old toys, operated by the Norman County Historical Society in a former school
Northwest Minnesota Sugarbeet Museum		Crookston; 47°45′41″N 96°35′43″W	Polk	Northwest Minnesota	Agriculture	Sugarbeet and agriculture related equipment and memorabilia
Red Wing Marine Museum		Red Wing; 44°33′51″N 92°32′34″W	Goodhue	Southeast Minnesota	Industry	A collection of boat motors manufactured by a notable local company in operation 1902–1979, plus rotating exhibits on boat and river history, housed in an 1884 waterworks.
Red Wing Shoes Museum		Red Wing; 44°33′58″N 92°32′4″W	Goodhue	Southeast Minnesota	Industry	Company museum of Red Wing Shoes featuring hands-on displays, a wall of honor, and a Norman Rockwell gallery featuring original art from 1960s footwear ads. On display is the world's largest boot, over 20 feet (6 m) high.
Redwood County Museum		Redwood Falls; 44°32′39.5″N 95°8′3″W	Redwood	Minnesota River Valley	Local history	Operated by the Redwood County Historical Society, includes period rooms, artifacts of local history and culture
R. D. Hubbard House		Mankato; 44°9′42″N 94°0′18″W	Blue Earth	Minnesota River Valley	Historic house	Victorian period house, operated by the Blue Earth County Historical Society
Renville County Historical Museum		Morton; 44°33′20″N 94°59′2″W	Renville	Minnesota River Valley	Local history	Operated by the Renville County Historical Society
Rice County Museum of History		Faribault; 44°18′37.5″N 93°16′24″W	Rice	Southeast Minnesota	Local history	Operated by the Rice County Historical Society, exhibits include a Main Street business display, notable residents, natural history, military history, Sellner Manufacturing
Rochester Art Center		Rochester; 44°1′17″N 92°27′30″W	Olmsted	Southeast Minnesota	Art	Changing exhibits of contemporary art
Rock County Historical Museum		Luverne; 43°39′14″N 96°12′20″W	Rock	Southwest Minnesota	Local history	Local history exhibits housed in a former auto showroom. The Rock County Historical Society also manages original and replica buildings at the county fairgrounds and an 1892 house.
Rollingstone Luxembourg Heritage Museum		Rollingstone; 44°5′51″N 91°49′4″W	Winona	Southeast Minnesota	Local history	Local artifacts of a Luxembourg American community, housed in a 1900 municipal hall.
Roseau County Museum and Interpretive Center		Roseau; 48°50′48″N 95°45′42″W	Roseau	Northwest Minnesota	Local history	Operated by the Roseau County Historical Society
Roseau Pioneer Farm and Village		Roseau; 48°50′59″N 95°49′6″W	Roseau	Northwest Minnesota	Open-air	Includes over 15 historic buildings
Rourke Art Museum		Moorhead; 46°52′25″N 96°46′17″W	Clay	Northwest Minnesota	Art	Works from around the world and many traditions
Runestone Museum		Alexandria; 45°53′25″N 95°22′41″W	Douglas	West Minnesota	Open-air	Includes Kensington Runestone, pioneer period rooms, Minnesota natural history dioramas, early photos, Norse history, Native American exhibit, and restored Fort Alexandria with school and general store
Rural America Arts Center		Plainview; 44°9′55″N 92°10′18″W	Wabasha	Southeast Minnesota	Art	Started in 2004 the center was home to the Greenwood Prairie Art Gallery and the Jon Hassler Theater. Throughout the year it features exhibits of visual artwork by regional painters, sculptors, drawing artists, and photographers.
Rural Heritage Museum		St. Charles; 43°58′11″N 92°4′18″W	Winona	Southeast Minnesota	Open-air	Historic schoolhouse, log cabin, and log barn, plus an exhibit building with local artifacts. Operated by the Winona County Historical Society at the county fairgrounds.
Rural School Museum		Pine City; 45°49′11″N 92°58′17.5″W	Pine	Northeast Minnesota	Local history	The schoolhouse was built in 1908. In 1972 was restored and moved to Pine City and is used as museum. One week school sessions take place in June and are open to children in grades one to eight. The children study reading, writing and arithmetic from textbooks dating back to the 1890s.
Rushford Depot Museum		Rushford; 43°48′25″N 91°45′19″W	Fillmore	Southeast Minnesota	Local history	Built in 1867 by the Southern Minnesota Railroad, Rushford Depot is the oldest two-story railroad station remaining on its original site.
St. Francis Xavier Church		Chippewa City; 47°45′29″N 90°18′42.7″W	Cook	Northeast Minnesota	Local history	Constructed in 1895 in the Ojibwe community of Chippewa City, Minnesota it is listed on the NRHP. Operated by the Cook County Historical Society.
St. James Historical Society & Museum		St. James; 43°58′48.5″N 94°37′36″W	Watonwan	Minnesota River Valley	Local history	Museum of local artifacts and adjacent 1883 church.
St. Joseph Area Historical Society Museum		St. Joseph	Stearns	Central Minnesota	Local history	The museum consists of photos, tools, postcards, clothes, and other antiquities that show the progression of the local area.
St. Louis County Historical Society Museum		Duluth; 46°46′53″N 92°6′15″W	St. Louis	Northeast Minnesota	Local history	Part of the Duluth Depot
St. Peter State Hospital Museum		St. Peter; 44°18′19.5″N 93°58′40″W	Nicollet	Minnesota River Valley	Medical	On the grounds of the St. Peter Regional Treatment Center and residing in the old 1866 administration building of the "Minnesota Hospital for the Insane", the St Peter State Hospital Museum showcases the history of Minnesota's first and oldest state hospital which opened in 1866 to serve the mentally ill and mentally ill and dangerous. Exhibits also display the history of Minnesota's state hospital system.
Sand Hill Settlement		Climax; 47°36′30″N 96°49′26″W	Polk	Northwest Minnesota	Local history	The 1871 homestead of Ole O. Estenson, a pioneer in the Red River Valley. The homestead includes the Estenson's barn and cabin. Operated by the Sand Hill Settlement Historical Society.
Sandstone History and Art Center		Sandstone; 46°7′55.6″N 92°52′0″W	Pine	Northeast Minnesota	Local history	Housed in a historic former commercial building, the museum has displays on 1894 fire, quarries, railroads, and Native Americans in the Sandstone area. The facility also contains a research center.
Sauk Centre Area Historical Society Museum		Sauk Centre; 45°44′5.6″N 94°57′8.5″W	Stearns	Central Minnesota	Local history	Local artifacts and research material housed in a 1904 Carnegie library.
Saum Schools		Battle Township; 47°58′35″N 94°40′34″W	Beltrami	Northwest Minnesota	Education	The one-room log school built was in 1903. It was replaced by a 1912 two-story frame schoolhouse and operated as one of Minnesota's first consolidated schools until it closed in 1960. The building is operated as a museum and community center by the Saum Community Club, Inc.
Schech Mill		Caledonia; 43°40′2″N 91°34′50″W	Houston	Southeast Minnesota	Industry	Late-19th-century working watermill
Schwanke Car, Tractor and Truck Museum		Willmar; 45°5′40.5″N 95°2′43″W	Kandiyohi	Minnesota River Valley	Transportation	Private collection of tractors, cars, trucks, gas engines, gas pumps, signs and more
Settler's Square Museum		Warren; 48°12′0″N 96°45′37″W	Marshall	Northwest Minnesota	Open-air	Operated by the Marshall County Historical Society, depicts an 1880s street with store fronts, antique farm machinery and the UFO Sheriff's car of Marshall County
The Shed		Warroad; 48°54′49″N 95°19′45.5″W	Roseau	Northwest Minnesota	Automobile	Open by appointment, collection of classic and muscle cars, automotive, sports and music memorabilia
Sibley County Historical Society Museum		Henderson; 44°31′41″N 93°54′38″W	Sibley	Minnesota River Valley	Local history	Located in the 1880s August F. Poehler House
Sinclair Lewis Boyhood Home		Sauk Centre; 45°44′14.2″N 94°57′26.5″W	Stearns	Central Minnesota	Biographical	Boyhood home and museum about author Sinclair Lewis
Sleepy Eye Depot Museum		Sleepy Eye; 44°17′54″N 94°43′25″W	Brown	Minnesota River Valley	Local history	The Museum displays historical artifacts related to the city's founding, as well as notable city events and figures. Next to the museum there is a granite monument marking the burial site of the town's namesake, Chief Ish Tal Ha Ba or Sleepy Eyes. Operated by the Sleepy Eye Area Historical Society.
Snake River Fur Post		Pine City; 45°49′17″N 93°0′41″W	Pine	Northeast Minnesota	Living history	Reconstructed post from the winter of 1804–05
Soudan Underground Mine State Park		Breitung Township; 47°49′10″N 92°14′30″W	St. Louis	Northeast Minnesota	Mining	Tours of Minnesota's oldest, deepest and richest iron mine
Springfield Museum		Springfield; 44°14′19.5″N 94°58′36″W	Brown	Minnesota River Valley	Local history	The Springfield Museum is home to the Springfield Area Historical Society's collection of historical artifacts, records, and other information.
SMSU Art Museum		Marshall; 44°27′17″N 95°45′33″W	Lyon	Southwest Minnesota	Art	Part of Southwest Minnesota State University, two galleries and displays around campus
SMSU Museum of Indigenous Americans		Marshall; 44°27′23″N 95°45′34″W	Lyon	Southwest Minnesota	Art	Part of Southwest Minnesota State University, Native American artifacts including pottery, artwork, baskets, projectile points
SMSU Natural History Museum		Marshall; 44°27′21″N 95°45′37″W	Lyon	Southwest Minnesota	Natural history	Part of Southwest Minnesota State University, plants and animals of southwest Minnesota
Spam Museum		Austin; 43°40′10″N 92°58′28″W	Mower	Southeast Minnesota	Food	A museum about Spam owned and operated by the Hormel Company.
Spirit of Peace Indian Museum		Pipestone	Pipestone	Southwest Minnesota	Native American	Exhibits on the local history of quarrying and making ceremonial pipes. Dakota-owned and operated.
Split Rock Lighthouse		Two Harbors; 47°12′0″N 91°22′1″W	Lake	Northeast Minnesota	Maritime	Includes the original tower and lens, the fog signal building, the oil house, and the three keepers' houses
Spring Valley Methodist Church Museum		Spring Valley; 43°41′17″N 92°23′34.7″W	Fillmore	Southeast Minnesota	Local history	Housed in former church attended by the family of Laura Ingalls Wilder, local history exhibits, operated by the Spring Valley Community Historical Society
Staples Depot Museum		Staples	Todd	Central Minnesota	Local history	The Staples Depot Museum is housed in the historic 1910 Northern Pacific Railway depot in Staples, Minnesota, which also functions as an active Amtrak station. The museum is owned and operated by the Staples Historical Society.
Starbuck Depot and Museums		Starbuck; 45°36′42″N 95°31′50″W	Pope	West Minnesota	Local History, Open-Air	The campus consists of a depot museum, a schoolhouse museum, a turn-of-the-century threshing kitchen, Skoglund Building - formerly the office of the Standard Lumber Company, and a historic marker at the site where the world's largest lefse was created.
Stearns History Museum		St. Cloud; 45°32′51″N 94°12′9″W	Stearns	Central Minnesota	Local history	Two-story museum of Stearns County history, established in 1982 within a 100-acre (40 ha) park.
Steele County History Center		Owatonna; 44°4′7″N 93°13′4″W	Steele	Southeast Minnesota	Local history	The history center features a rotating exhibit hall, genealogy research room, event center, meeting rooms and a gift shop;adjacent to the Village of Yesteryear.
Stevens County Historical Museum		Morris; 45°35′8.5″N 95°55′4″W	Stevens	West Minnesota	Local history	Operated by the Stevens County Historical Society
Swensson Farm Museum		Montevideo; 44°52′44″N 95°35′32″W	Chippewa	Minnesota River Valley	Agriculture	17-acre (6.9 ha) farmstead of an innovative Swedish immigrant, with a 22-room brick farmhouse and 1880s barn. Operated by the Chippewa County Historical Society.
Swift County History Museum		Benson; 45°18′37″N 95°36′55″W	Swift	Minnesota River Valley	Local history	Interprets local history with period rooms, themed exhibits, model buildings, and displays by decade up to the 1990s. Operated by the Swift County Historical Society.
Terrace Mill		Sedan; 45°30′39″N 95°19′15″W	Pope	West Minnesota	Open-air	Includes 1903 flour mill, 1870s log cabin, cottage with Scandinavian furnishings and folk art, located in the Terrace Mill Historic District
Todd County Historical Museum		Long Prairie; 45°58′26″N 94°51′34″W	Todd	Central Minnesota	Local history	Education and research center on Todd County history
Toimi Community School		Brimson; 47°23′59″N 91°45′22″W	Lake	Northeast Minnesota	Local History	A historic one-room school house with attached teacherage built in 1909 by Finnish immigrants that settled in Northern Minnesota.
Tower Train Museum		Tower; 47°48′16″N 92°16′45″W	St. Louis	Northeast Minnesota	Railroad	Housed in a 1916 former passenger railroad depot listed on the National Register of Historic Places, it includes a 1910 Duluth and Iron Range Railway class K-1 2-8-0 (number 1218) steam locomotive, and displays on mining, logging, early settlements as well as historical documents relating to Tower-Soudan and Lake Vermilion area. Operated by the Tower-Soudan Historical Society.
Traverse County Historical Society Museum		Wheaton; 45°48′16.5″N 96°30′0.5″W	Traverse	West Minnesota	Local history	Includes replicas of a meat market, a dentist's office, home living quarters and a general store
Treaty Site History Center		St. Peter; 44°20′56″N 93°57′1″W	Nicollet	Minnesota River Valley	Local history	Operated by the Nicollet County Historical Society, includes exhibits about the Treaty of Traverse des Sioux
Tri River Pioneer Museum		Plummer; 47°54′39″N 96°2′23.5″W	Red Lake	Northwest Minnesota	Local history	Tri River Museum was established in 2006 to preserve the history and artifacts of the Tri River area which includes the Clearwater River, Red Lake River, and the Lost River.
Trondhjem Norwegian Lutheran Church		Lonsdale; 44°27′51″N 93°24′8″W	Rice	Southeast Minnesota	Local history	A restored 1899 Norwegian Lutheran church near Lonsdale, MN, built by immigrants and listed on the National Register, it is now a museum and event center maintained by the Trondhjem Community Preservation Society. After the congregation left in 1988, it hosts weddings, concerts, and heritage events.
Tweed Museum of Art		Duluth; 46°49′7″N 92°5′4″W	St. Louis	Northeast Minnesota	Art	Part of University of Minnesota Duluth, strengths in American landscape painting
Twin Valley Heritage & Art Center		Twin Valley; 47°15′39.5″N 96°15′30.7″W	Norman	Northwest Minnesota	Local history	Local history, rotating art gallery and information center
Two Harbors Lighthouse Museum		Two Harbors; 47°0′50.5″N 91°39′50″W	Lake	Northeast Minnesota	Maritime	Minnesota's oldest operating lighthouse, completed in 1892. Managed by the Lake County Historical Society, offering tours, exhibits, and bed & breakfast accommodations.
Ulen Museum		Ulen; 47°4′46.7″N 96°15′34″W	Clay	Northwest Minnesota	Local history	Displays of memorabilia from the mid to late 19th century in pioneer cabin rooms.
United States Hockey Hall of Fame		Eveleth; 47°28′17″N 92°31′43″W	St. Louis	Northeast Minnesota	Sports	
Vasa Museum		Vasa; 44°30′14″N 92°43′22.5″W	Goodhue	Southeast Minnesota	Local history	Early area Swedish heritage
Verndale Museum		Verndale; 46°23′59.3″N 95°0′40.2″W	Wadena	Central Minnesota	Local history	Operated by the Verndale Historical Society, open by appointment
Virginia Area Historical Society Museum		Virginia; 47°31′44.5″N 92°32′51.5″W	St. Louis	Northeast Minnesota	Local history	Includes exhibits on the logging era, Virginia's two major fires, and the trolley line
Village of Yesteryear		Owatonna; 44°4′7″N 93°13′4″W	Steele	Southeast Minnesota	Open-air	A recreated village of 15 furnished buildings and structures reminiscent of the late 19th century. The centerpiece of the village is the Dunnell Mansion built in 1868. Placed around a central park encircled by a boardwalk. Operated by the Steele County Historical Society.
Voyageurs National Park		International Falls; 48°35′5″N 93°9′40″W	Koochiching	Northeast Minnesota	Local history	Museum in visitor center at Rainy Lake Visitor Center, interpretive exhibits at Kabetogama Lake Visitor Center
Wabasha County Historical Museum		Reads Landing; 44°24′4.5″N 92°4′46″W	Wabasha	Southeast Minnesota	Local history	Operated by the Wabasha County Historical Society in the Reads Landing School
Wadena County Historical Society Museum		Wadena; 46°26′52″N 95°7′56″W	Wadena	Central Minnesota	Local history	
Wakefield House Museum		Blue Earth; 43°38′20″N 94°5′52″W	Faribault	Minnesota River Valley	House museum	Built in 1868 by James B. Wakefield, one of Blue Earth's original founders, the Wakefield House is now the county historical museum. Operated by the Faribault County Historical Society.
Wanda Gág House Interpretive Center and Museum		New Ulm; 44°18′51″N 94°27′56.3″W	Brown	Minnesota River Valley	Biographical	Home of artist Anton Gág and children's author Wanda Gág
Warroad Heritage Center		Warroad; 48°54′25″N 95°19′3″W	Roseau	Northwest Minnesota	Local history	Exhibits include fishing, industry, ranching, boating, Native Americans and transportation
Waseca County Historical Society Museum		Waseca; 44°4′43.3″N 93°30′12.6″W	Waseca	Southeast Minnesota	Local history	Local artifacts housed in an early-20th-century church building. It includes a research library in the Philo C. Bailey House across the street.
Washburn-Zittleman House Museum		Spring Valley; 43°41′15.5″N 92°23′35.5″W	Fillmore	Southeast Minnesota	Local history	Includes turn of the 20th century furnishing, quilts, toys, period kitchen, agriculture machinery, operated by the Spring Valley Community Historical Society
Wasioja Civil War Recruiting Station		Wasioja; 44°4′45.6″N 92°49′9.3″W	Dodge	Southeast Minnesota	Military	Built in 1855 to serve as a law office and bank, it was converted into a Civil War recruiting station in 1861. Many of the recruits from the station served in Company C of the Second Minnesota Regiment. Operated by the Dodge County Historical Society, it as the only remaining American Civil War recruiting station in Minnesota.
Watkins Museum & Store		Winona; 44°2′59″N 91°37′41.5″W	Winona	Southeast Minnesota	Industry	Vintage products, advertising, and other memorabilia from the 150-year history of Watkins Incorporated, housed in the company's 1911 headquarters building.
Watonwan County Historical Center		Madelia; 44°2′45″N 94°25′22″W	Watonwan	Minnesota River Valley	Local history	Contains horse-drawn farm equipment, an original post office and log cabin, a recreated drug store, and information on the capture of the Younger Brothers. Operated by the Watonwan County Historical Society.
Wells Depot Museum		Wells; 43°44′46″N 93°43′37″W	Faribault	Minnesota River Valley	Local history	The 1903 depot is listed on the National Register of Historic Places. It was restored and opened to the public as a museum in 2010 and features a collection of area history and historical items including railroad, military and genealogy.
Westbrook Heritage House Museum		Westbrook; 44°2′23″N 95°26′7″W	Cottonwood	Southwest Minnesota	Local history	Restored 1900 depot with local history exhibits and a log cabin from the late 19th century.
West Concord Historical Society		West Concord; 44°8′55″N 92°54′4″W	Dodge	Southeast Minnesota	Local history	The historical society shares the former West Concord High School building with Community Center. The building, built in 1902 with a 1936 addition, is listed on the National Register of Historic Places.
Wheels Across the Prairie Museum		Tracy; 44°14′17″N 95°38′8″W	Lyon	Southwest Minnesota	Open-air	Includes car barn, post office, schoolhouse, train depot, chapel, church, blacksmith shop and pioneer exhibits.
Wilkin County Museum		Breckenridge; 46°15′53″N 96°35′5″W	Wilkin	West Minnesota	Local history	Operated by the Wilkin County Historical Society, The building originally was a Masonic Temple but was donated to Wilkin County Historical Society in 1977. The museum has eight rooms furnished with antiques including a 1920s kitchen, a small chapel and a historic bank lobby.
William A. Irvin		Duluth; 46°46′58″N 92°5′50″W	St. Louis	Northeast Minnesota	Maritime	Retired lake freighter with a 14,000-ton cargo capacity and luxury passenger quarters, in service 1938–1978.
Winnebago Area Museum		Winnebago; 43°46′3″N 94°9′56″W	Faribault	Minnesota River Valley	Local history	Houses one of the largest privately held Native American artifacts collections in the state
Winona County History Center		Winona; 44°3′9″N 91°38′21″W	Winona	Southeast Minnesota	Local history	Three floors of exhibits—including a replica prehistoric rock shelter, J.R. Watkins' original desk, and children's exhibits—plus an art gallery. Operated by the Winona County Historical Society in a 1915 armory and modern addition.
Wm. S. Marvin Training and Visitor Center		Warroad; 48°54′55.5″N 95°19′48″W	Roseau	Northwest Minnesota	Industry	History and manufacture of Marvin Windows and Doors
Winthrop Community Historical Society Museum		Winthrop; 44°32′31″N 94°21′46″W	Sibley	Minnesota River Valley	Local history	Houses a growing collection of artifacts and documents from local residents and businesses.
Yellow Medicine County Historical Society and Museum		Granite Falls; 44°48′12.2″N 95°32′45″W	Yellow Medicine	Minnesota River Valley	Local history	Offers permanent and temporary exhibits on local history, along with a research library for genealogy and historical records.
Zumbrota Area Historical Society Museum		Zumbrota; 44°17′38″N 92°40′6.3″W	Goodhue	Southeast Minnesota	Local history	Local artifacts and memorabilia housed in a renovated 1924 City Hall/Fire Department.

== Regions defined ==

Northwest Minnesota Region

Counties: Becker, Beltrami, Clay, Grant, Kittson, Lake of the Woods, Mahnomen, Marshall, Norman, Pennington, Polk, Red Lake, Roseau

Northeast Minnesota Region

Counties: Aitkin, Carlton, Clearwater, Cook, Itasca, Kanabec, Koochiching, Lake, Mille Lacs, Pine, Saint Louis

West Minnesota Region

Counties: Douglas, Grant, Otter Tail, Pope, Stevens, Traverse, Wilkin

Central Minnesota Region

Counties: Benton, Cass, Crow Wing, Hubbard, Morrison, Stearns, Todd, Wadena

Minnesota River Valley Region

Counties: Big Stone, Blue Earth, Brown, Chippewa, Kandiyohi, Lac qui Parle, Le Sueur, McLeod, Meeker, Nicollet, Redwood, Renville, Sibley, Swift, Yellow Medicine

Twin Cities Metro Region

Counties: Anoka, Carver, Chisago, Dakota, Hennepin, Isanti, Ramsey, Scott, Sherburne, Washington, Wright

Southwest Minnesota Region

Counties: Cottonwood, Faribault, Jackson, Lincoln, Lyon, Martin, Murray, Nobles, Pipestone, Rock, Watonwan

Southeast Minnesota Region

Counties: Dodge, Fillmore, Freeborn, Goodhue, Houston, Mower, Olmsted, Rice, Steele, Wabasha, Waseca, Winona

== Defunct museums ==
- Amdal House Museum, Lake Park, MN, was sold in 2015 and the collections of the Lake Park Area Historical Society moved to a new location.
- Arches Museum of Pioneer Life, Lewiston. The museum's collection, the Gainy/McCarthy schoolhouse, and Hill Log House were moved to the Winona County Fairgrounds in St. Charles to become the Rural Heritage Museum under administration of the Winona County Historical Society. The Hillsdale School District 81 (Prigge School) was moved to Winona State University to become part of their new Education Village.
- Arrowhead Bluffs Museum, Wabasha. Closed in October 2011. Displayed hunting trophies, antique rifles, and Native American artifacts.
- Baseball Museum, Minneapolis. Baseball memorabilia collected by a Minnesota Twins equipment manager and displayed in a souvenir shop near the Metrodome. Closed in 2015.
- Burbank-Livingston-Griggs House, St. Paul. Operated by the Minnesota Historical Society since 1968 as a museum. In 1996 it was sold and turned into three separate apartments.
- College of Visual Arts Gallery, Saint Paul. Gallery space of the former College of Visual Arts, which closed in 2013.
- Grand Mound History Center, near International Falls. Interpreted the prehistoric Grand Mound.
- Hubert H. Humphrey Museum, Waverly. Shut down after it suffered a catastrophic fire August 18, 1997. Surviving collections were moved to the Wright County Historical Society.
- The Le Sueur Museum in Le Sueur. Sold by the Le Sueur County Historical Society in January 2018 to the dairy cooperative Agropur Inc. The building was demolished in 2019.
- Mikkelson Collection, Willmar. Collection auctioned off in 2012.
- Midwest Music Museum, Bloomington. Was located at the Mall of America, no current information.
- Minnesota African American Museum, Minneapolis. Started in October 2012 in the historic Coe Mansion but never fully opened to the public. It was to display exhibits surrounding Minnesota's African-American community.
- Minnesota State Fair History Museum was replaced with the Minnesota State Fair History & Heritage Center which opened in 2014.
- Monongalia Historical Museum, New London, Minnesota housed in the former Lebanon Church. The Monongalia Historical Society vacated the building in November 2013. The building was demolished in June 2014.
- Museum of Questionable Medical Devices, Minneapolis. Closed in 2002 and collection transferred to the Science Museum of Minnesota.
- Planes of Fame East Air Museum, Eden Prairie. A WWII aviation museum that housed a collection of 30+ historic, flyable airplanes. Closed in 1997. Most airplanes transferred to the Palm Springs Air Museum.
- Rifle Sport Gallery, Minneapolis. An underground art space open 1985–1988 on Block E.
- Sinclair Lewis Interpretive Center, Sauk Centre. Property sold for development in 2016, collection moved to Sinclair Lewis Boyhood Home and temporary storage.
- Soderlund Pharmacy Museum, St. Peter. Medical instruments, pharmacological products, and show globes, plus a 1911 soda fountain, housed in a working drugstore. Closed as of 2014.
- Pioneer Museum, Spring Valley, Minnesota. Now a private residence.
- Story Lady Doll & Toy Museum, Albert Lea. When it closed in 2010, the collection was moved to the Freeborn County Historical Museum.
- TRACES Center for History and Culture, Landmark Center, Saint Paul. Interpreted the prisoner of war experience, closed November 2008.
- Wabasso Museum closed in 2010. Photo collections moved to the Wabasso Library.
- Wells Fargo History Museum in Minneapolis, MN was permanently closed along with 11 of 12 Wells Fargo History Museums around the country in 2020.
- Yesterfarm of Memories Museum, Center City, Minnesota. Operated from 1967 to approximately 1997. A private museum operated by Dennie and Hazel Magnuson.

== See also ==
- List of museums in the United States
- Aquaria in Minnesota (category)
- Astronomical observatories in Minnesota (category)
- Botanical gardens in Minnesota (category)
- List of historical societies in Minnesota
- List of nature centers in Minnesota
- Zoos in Minnesota (category)
