= Charles A. Weyerhaeuser Memorial Museum =

Museum in Little Falls, Minnesota

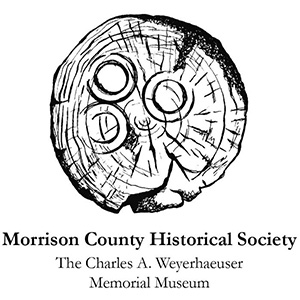

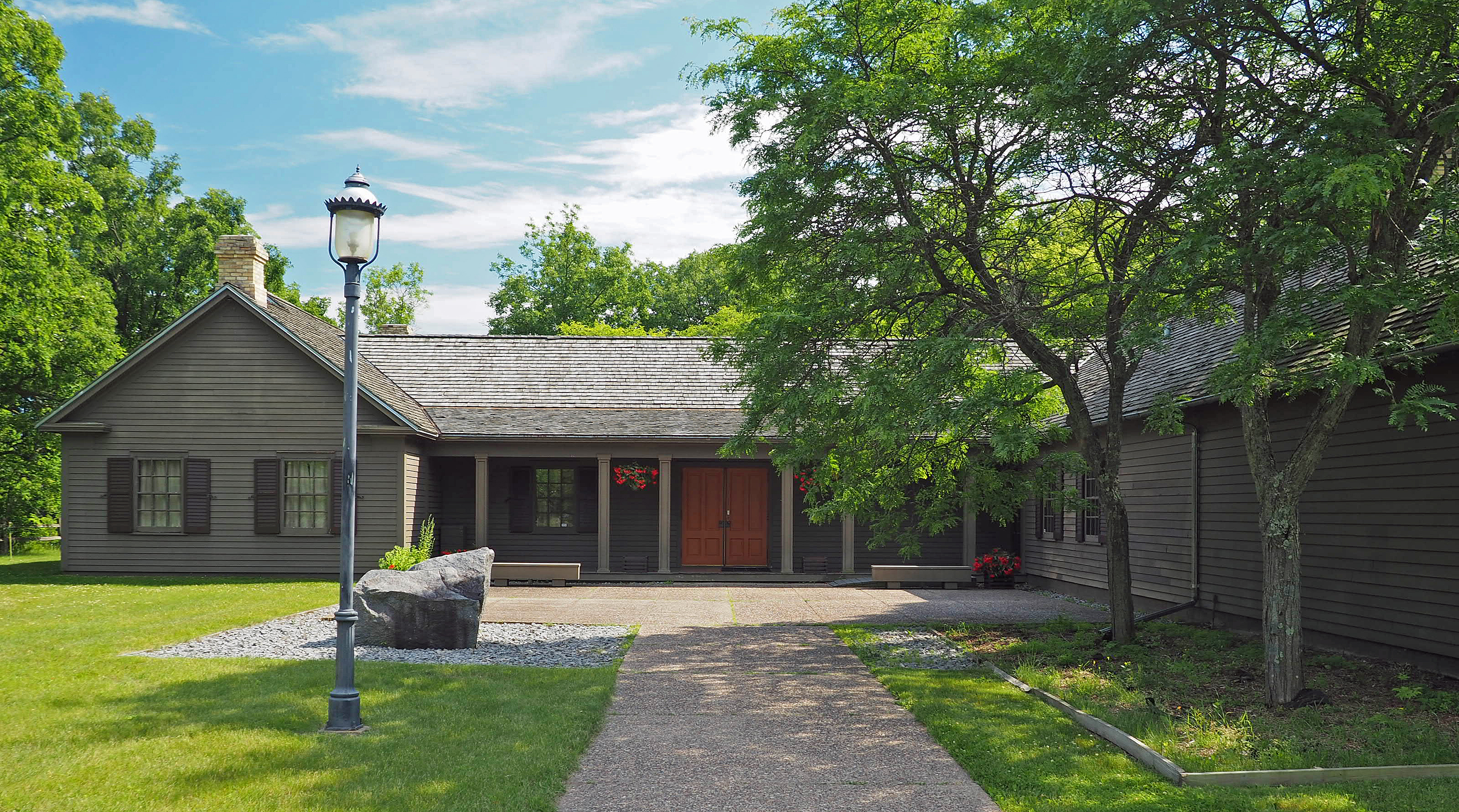
- Entrance
- Established: 1975
- Location: 2151 Lindbergh Drive S, Little Falls, Minnesota
- Coordinates: 45.954167°N 94.390278°W
- Type: Local history
- Executive director: Mike Worcester
- Website: morrisoncountyhistory.org

The Charles A. Weyerhaeuser Memorial Museum is located in Little Falls, Minnesota, on the banks of the Mississippi River. Established in 1975, the museum is owned and operated by the Morrison County Historical Society. The building itself was designed in a Greek Revival style to reflect the architectural choices of the county's early settlers.

The museum honors Charles A. Weyerhaeuser, a lumberman who played a significant role in the development of Little Falls. Weyerhaeuser arrived in the city in 1891 to manage the Pine Tree Lumber Company, which had been founded by his father and business partner's father.

== Exhibits ==
The museum explores the history of Morrison County, with a focus on lumbering and its impact on the region. Exhibits showcase the lives of early settlers, the importance of the Mississippi River for transportation, and the ecological changes that accompanied the logging industry. Beyond its permanent collection, the Charles A. Weyerhaeuser Memorial Museum also hosts temporary exhibits.

== Grounds ==
The museum grounds feature a reconstructed prairie garden and a Victorian-style fountain. Walking trails connect the museum to the Charles A. Lindbergh State Park and the Lindbergh House and Museum, offering visitors the opportunity to explore more of Little Falls' history.

== Morrison County Historical Society ==
The Morrison County Historical Society is a non-profit organization founded in 1936 dedicated to collecting, preserving, and interpreting the history of Morrison County.

In addition to the museum, the Morrison County Historical Society maintains a research library and archives. These resources contain historical documents, photographs, and artifacts related to Morrison County. The society also offers educational programs and events throughout the year, providing opportunities for the public to learn about the county's history.

== Gallery ==
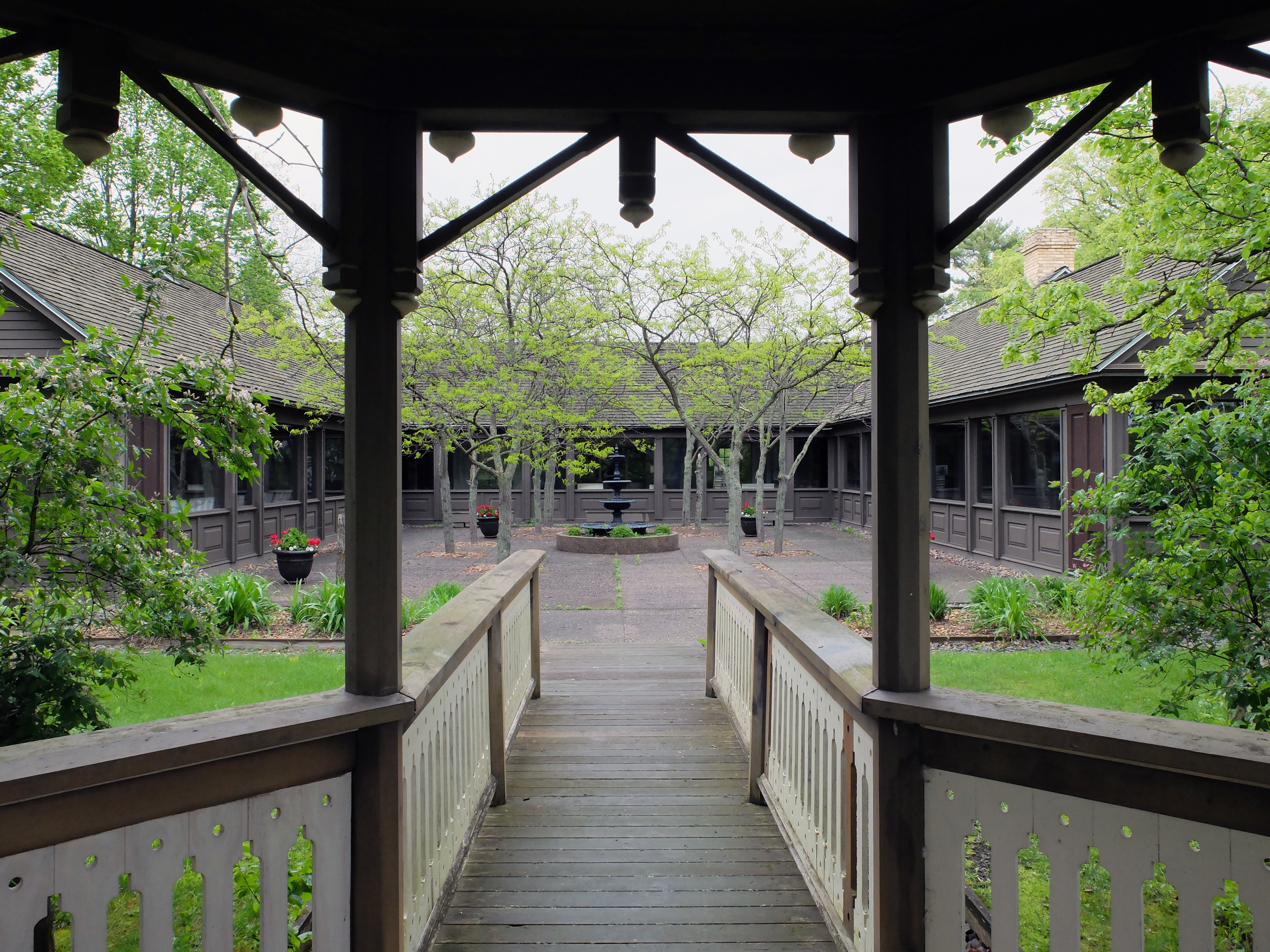
Courtyard

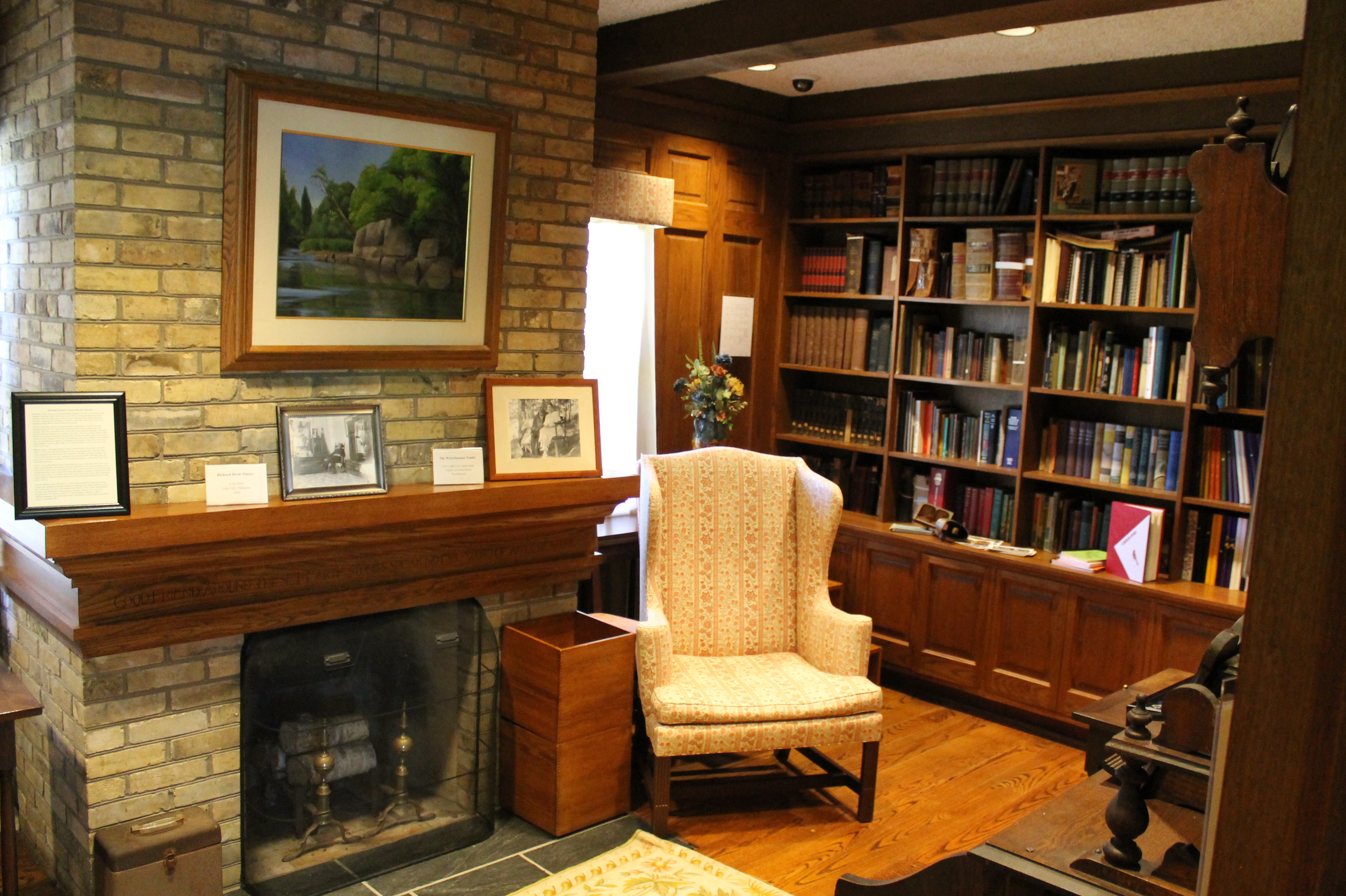
Library

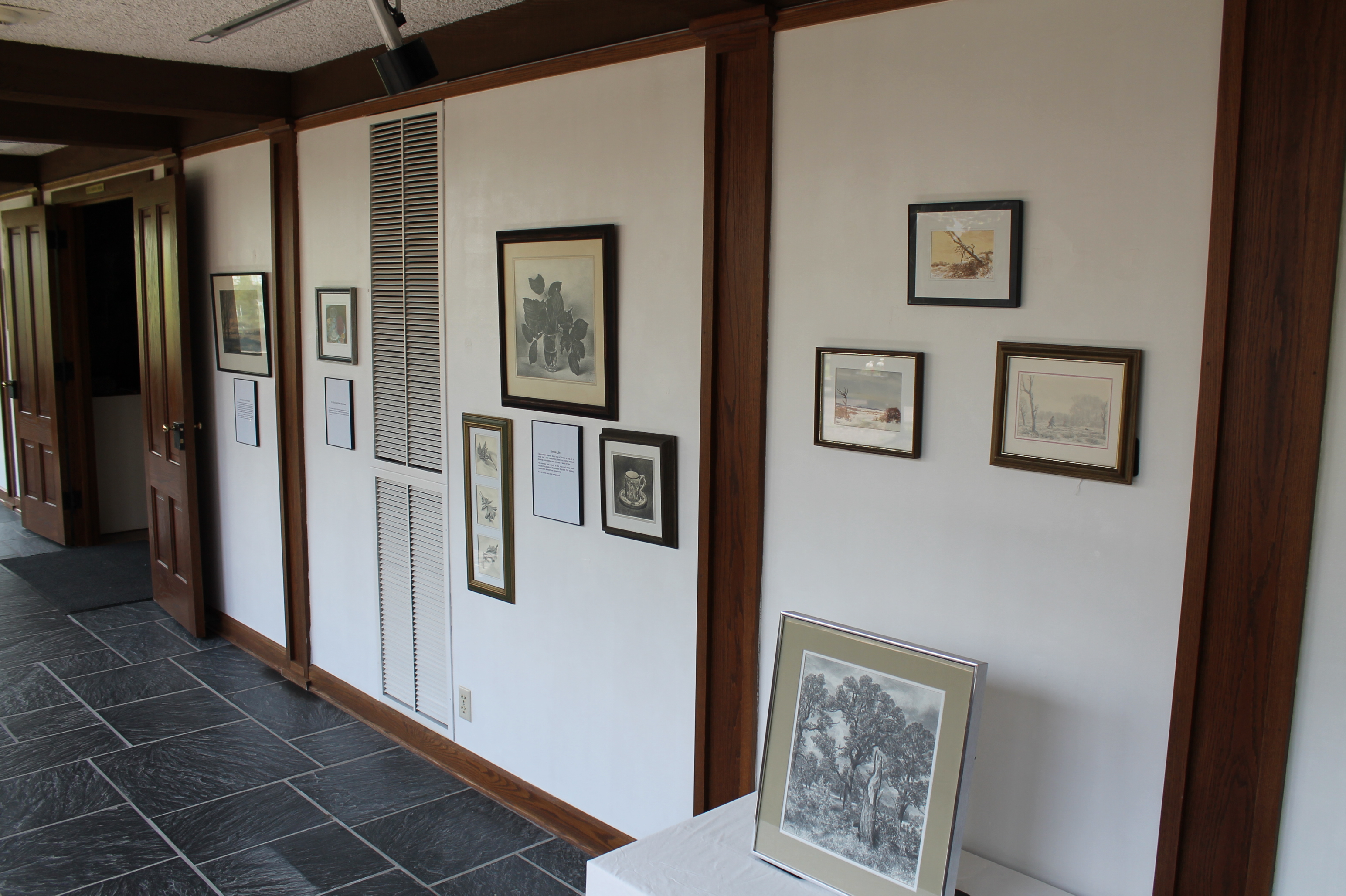
Gallery

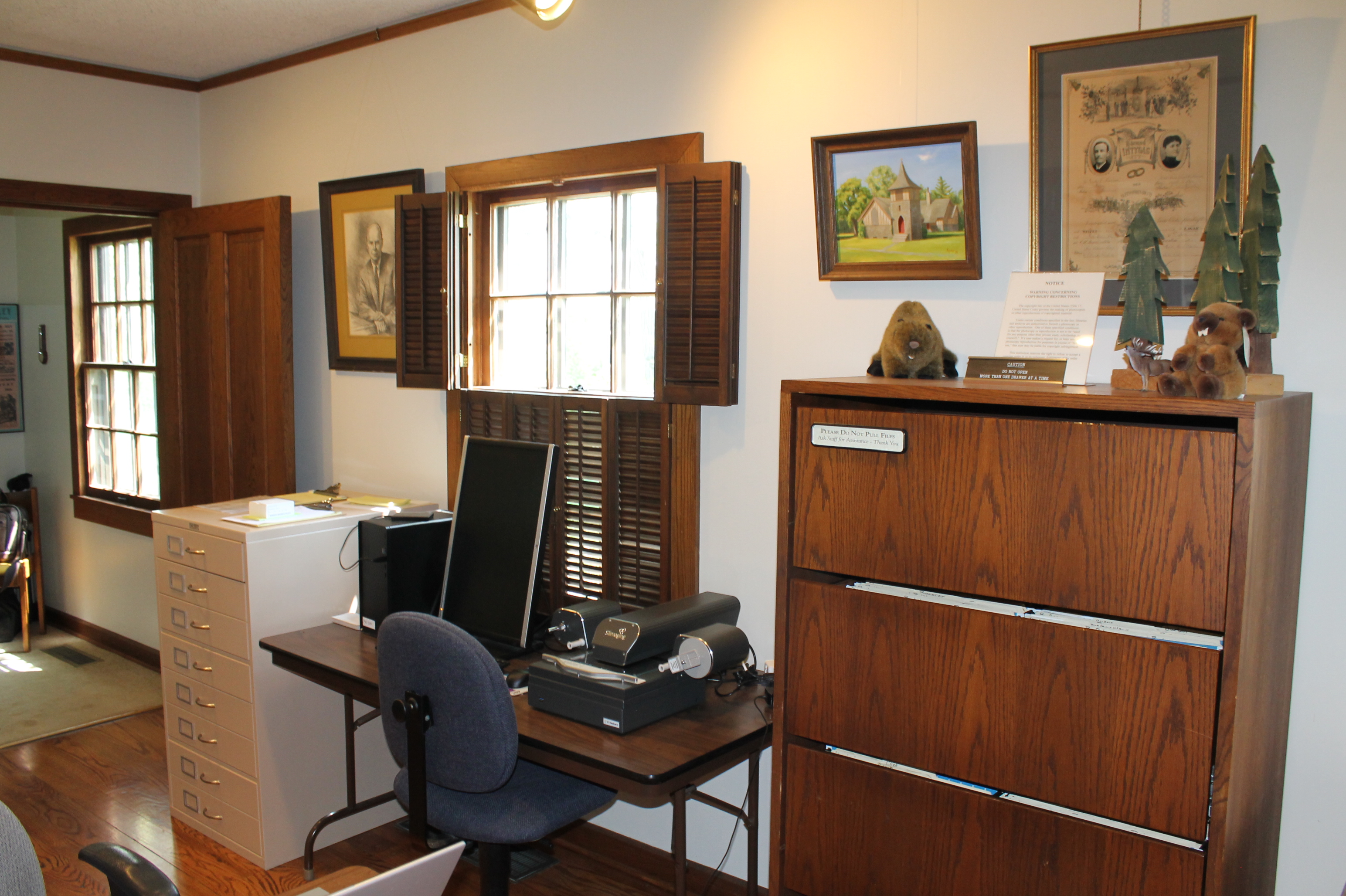
Research room microfilm reader

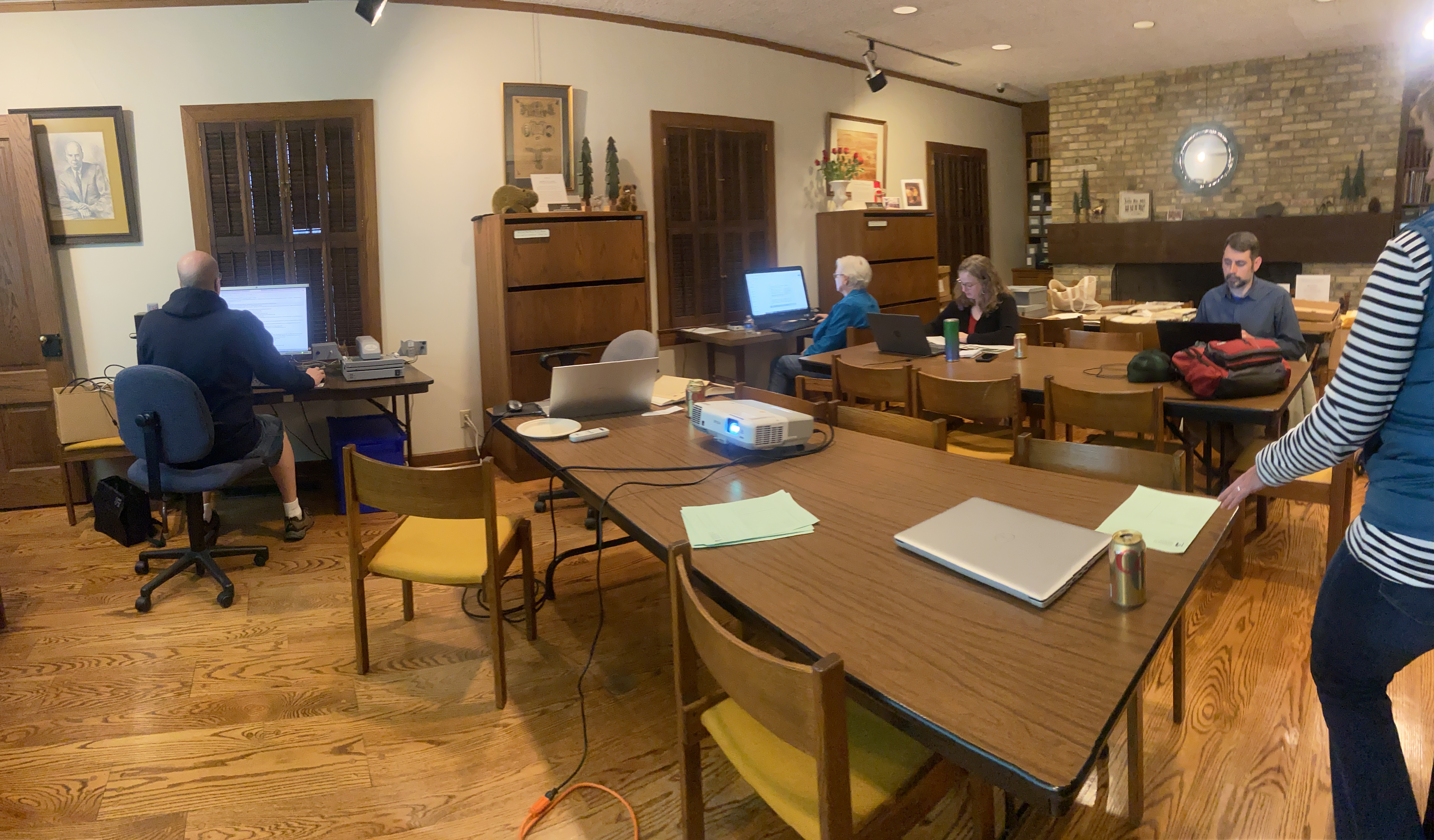
Wikipedia Local History Edit-a-thon in 2022

== See also ==
- List of museums in Minnesota
