= August F. Poehler House =

House in Minnesota, United States

- U.S. National Register of Historic Places
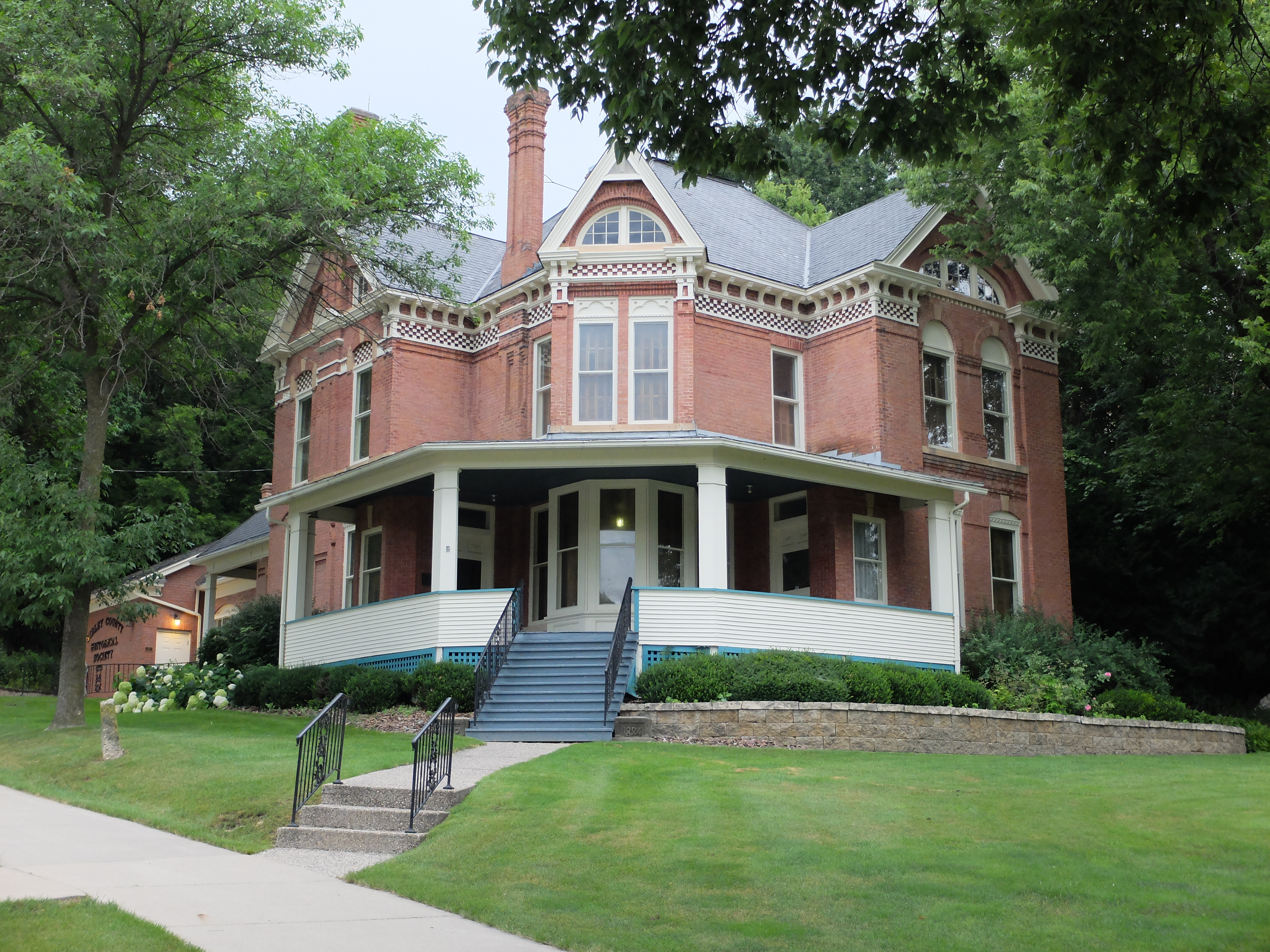
- The August F. Poehler House viewed from the southeast

- Location within Minnesota Location within the United States
- Location: 700 Main Street, Henderson, Minnesota
- Coordinates: 44°31′41″N 93°54′37.5″W
- Area: .8 acres (0.32 ha)
- Built: 1884
- Architect: George Pass
- Architectural style: Queen Anne
- NRHP reference No.: 82003037
- Added to NRHP: February 4, 1982

The August F. Poehler House is a historic house in Henderson, Minnesota, United States. It was built in 1884 for shopowners August and Emilie Poehler and their six children. Since 1949 the house has served as the Sibley County Historical Society Museum.

The Poehler House was listed on the National Register of Historic Places in 1982 for its local significance in the themes of architecture and commerce. It was nominated for its association with August Poehler, an early and influential settler in Henderson, and for exemplifying the fine residences built by the area's successful entrepreneurs in the second half of the 19th century.

== See also ==
- List of museums in Minnesota
- National Register of Historic Places listings in Sibley County, Minnesota
