= 3R Landmark School Museum =

Museum in Lonsdale, Minnesota

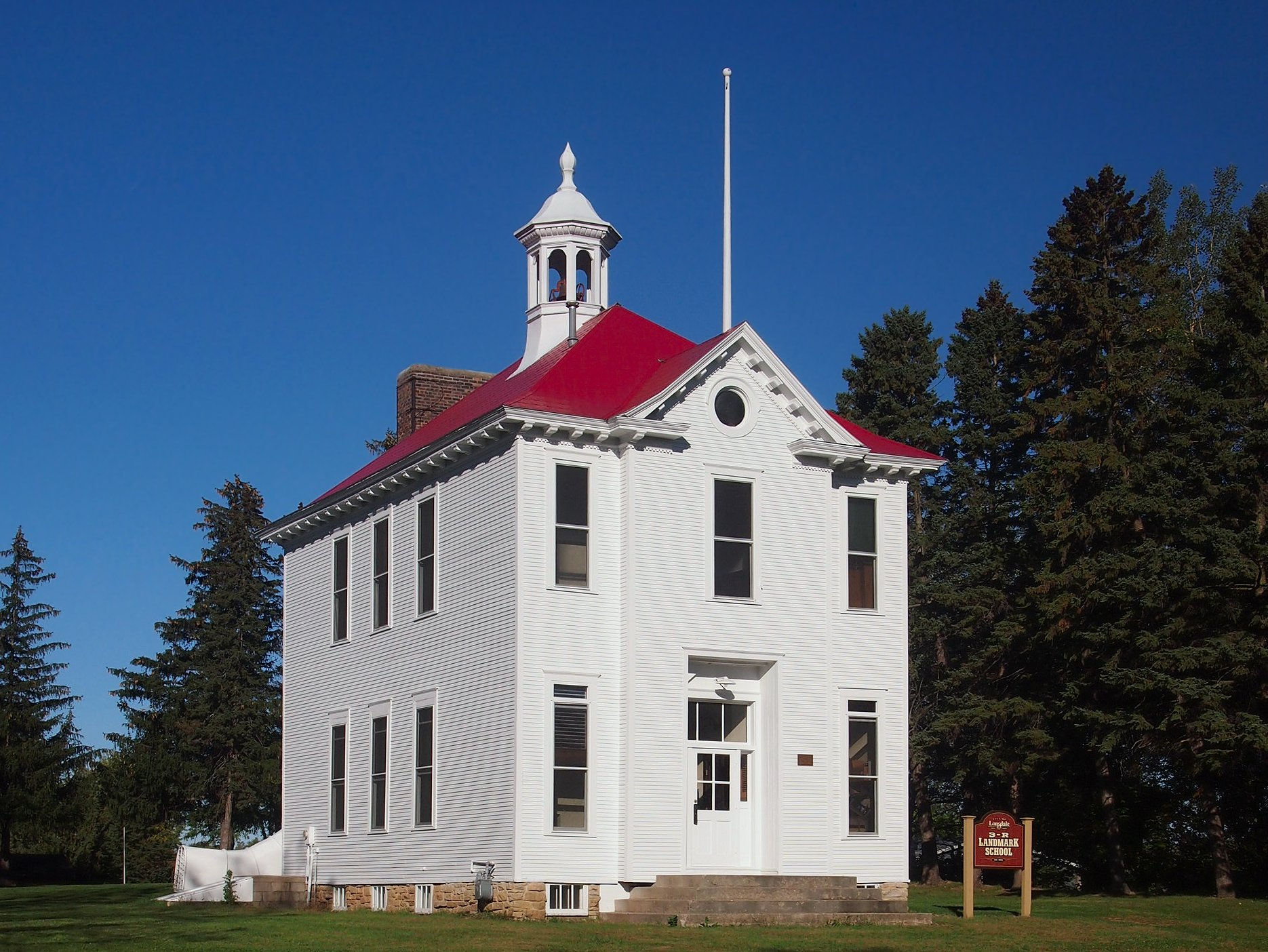
- Building in 2015
- Established: 1901
- Location: 405 3rd Avenue SW, Lonsdale, Minnesota, United States
- Coordinates: 44°28′40″N 93°25′55″W
- Type: Local History

- Lonsdale Public School
- U.S. National Register of Historic Places
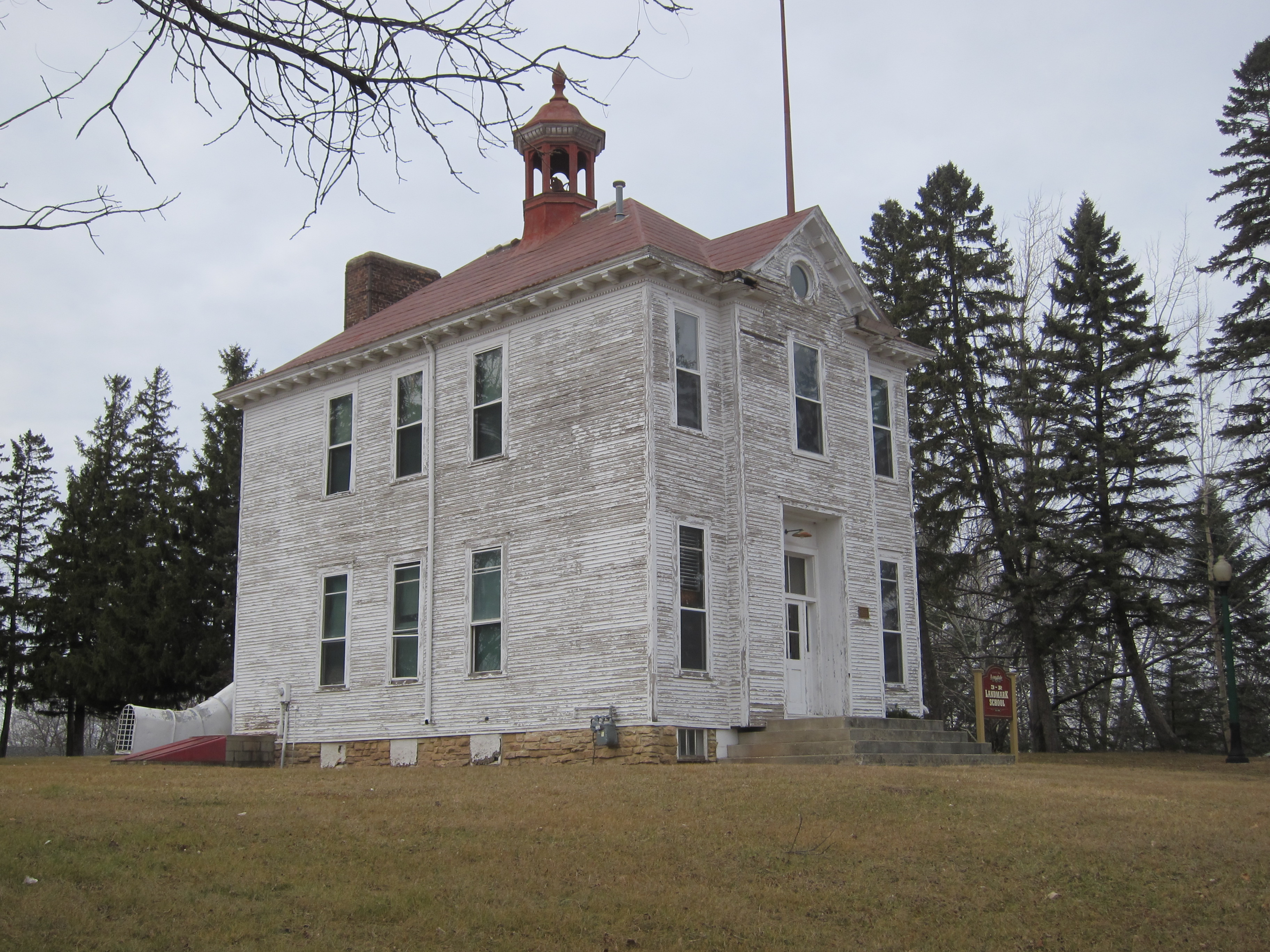
- Building in 2012

- Location within Minnesota Location within the United States
- Location: 405 3rd Avenue SW, Lonsdale, Minnesota, United States
- Built: 1901
- Architect: Patrick Sullivan
- NRHP reference No.: 79001254
- Designated: August 30, 1979

The 3R Landmark School Museum is located in a former two-story schoolhouse in Lonsdale, Minnesota. The museum run by the 3R Landmark Corporation opened in 1986 and features museum exhibits on local history while the second floor is preserved as an original classroom from when the building served as a public school for Independent School District #76 from 1908 to 1948.

== History ==
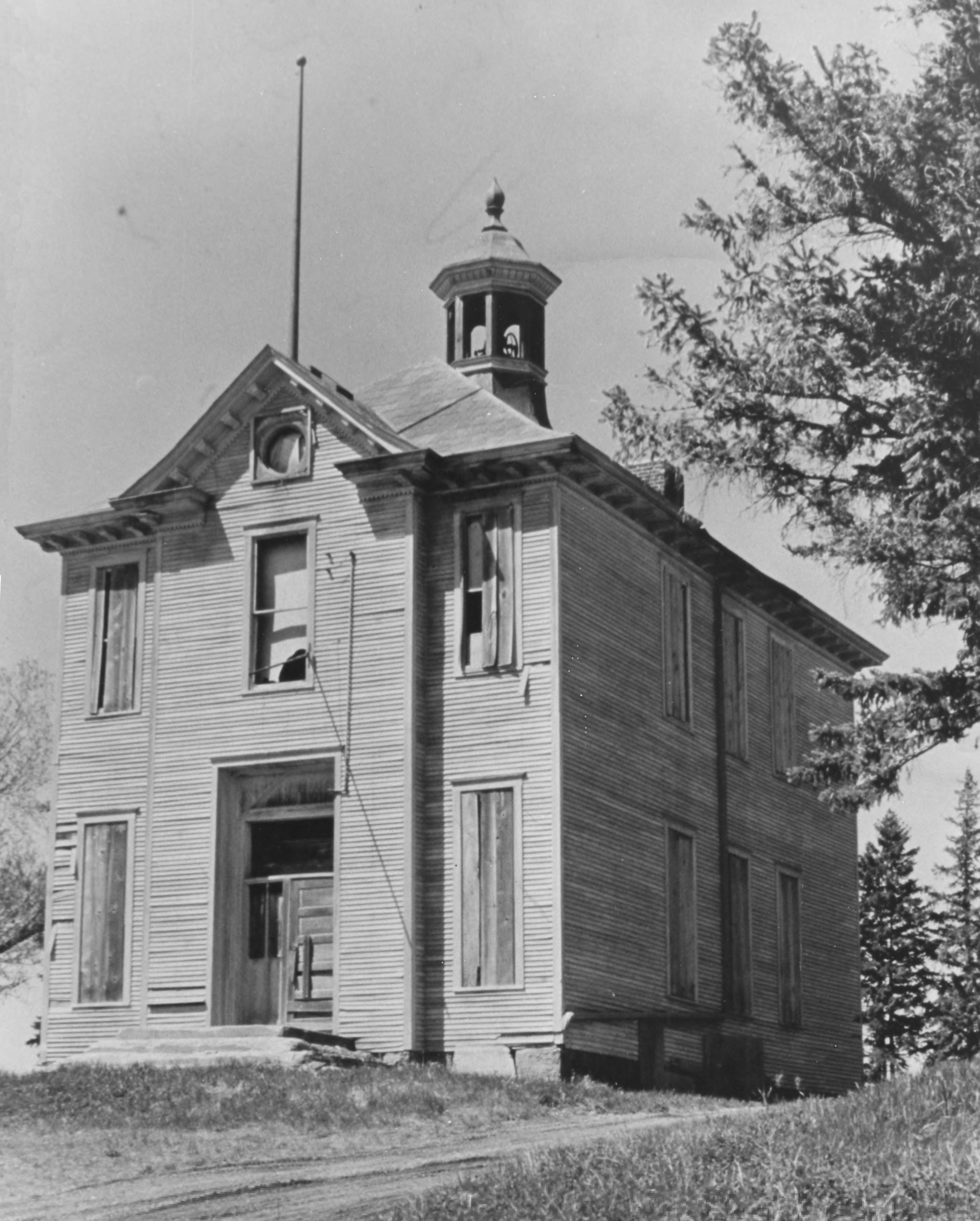
Vacant building in 1979

The 3R Landmark Corporation which operates the museum was established on November 15, 1978. During that time, local resident Loretta Reece collaborated with 15 other Lonsdale women to explore the restoration of the two-story Lonsdale public schoolhouse. They created a model of the schoolhouse to showcase the envisioned restoration and initiated research on its history, specifically on Patrick Sullivan, the school's builder. Additionally, they began the application process to nominate the building to the National Register of Historic Places. By January 1979, the application was submitted to the Minnesota State Historic Preservation Office at the Minnesota Historical Society.

In April 1979, the newly formed 3R Landmark Corporation hosted a public meeting at the Lonsdale American Legion Hall to discuss potential uses for the school. Subsequently, in September 1979, the Lonsdale Public Schoolhouse was officially listed in the National Register of Historic Places.

Following this recognition, the Lonsdale City Council approved a 99-year lease to the 3R Landmark Corporation, leading to groundbreaking ceremonies on April 22, 1980, and construction commencing in September. By November, foundational work, utility connections, and ground grading were successfully completed. As membership has aged the City of Lonsdale has taken over maintenance of the building with the organization seeking out new members.

== Lonsdale Public School ==
The Lonsdale Public School building, a two-story public schoolhouse was built in 1908 by local carpenter Patrick Sullivan, and holds significance for its architecture and connection to education in Lonsdale. Believed to be designed by Sullivan, the school's rectangular shape and vertical emphasis draw from late nineteenth-century plan book schools. Its decoration, including the cupola, reflects early American public buildings like Sir Christopher Wren's William and Mary College. The school served as a central hub for many years in Lonsdale's educational landscape until 1948.

== Building description ==
The Lonsdale Public School is situated atop one of Lonsdale's highest rolling hills. The two-story frame building, resting on a cut limestone foundation, spans 26 feet in width and 40 feet in depth. Standing at 24 feet from foundation to eave line, it features an octagonal cupola at the center of the tin hipped roof, still housing the original bell. The front facade boasts a three-bay design with a projecting pavilion, broken pediment, and oculus. On each side of the building, three bays are present. A metal fire chute runs diagonally across the rear, while the tall and narrow windows emphasize the verticality of the structure, especially on the front facade. Adorned with narrow clapboard, the eaves are embellished with dentils and modillions.

== See also ==
- List of museums in Minnesota
