= Arv Hus Museum =

Museum in Milan, Minnesota

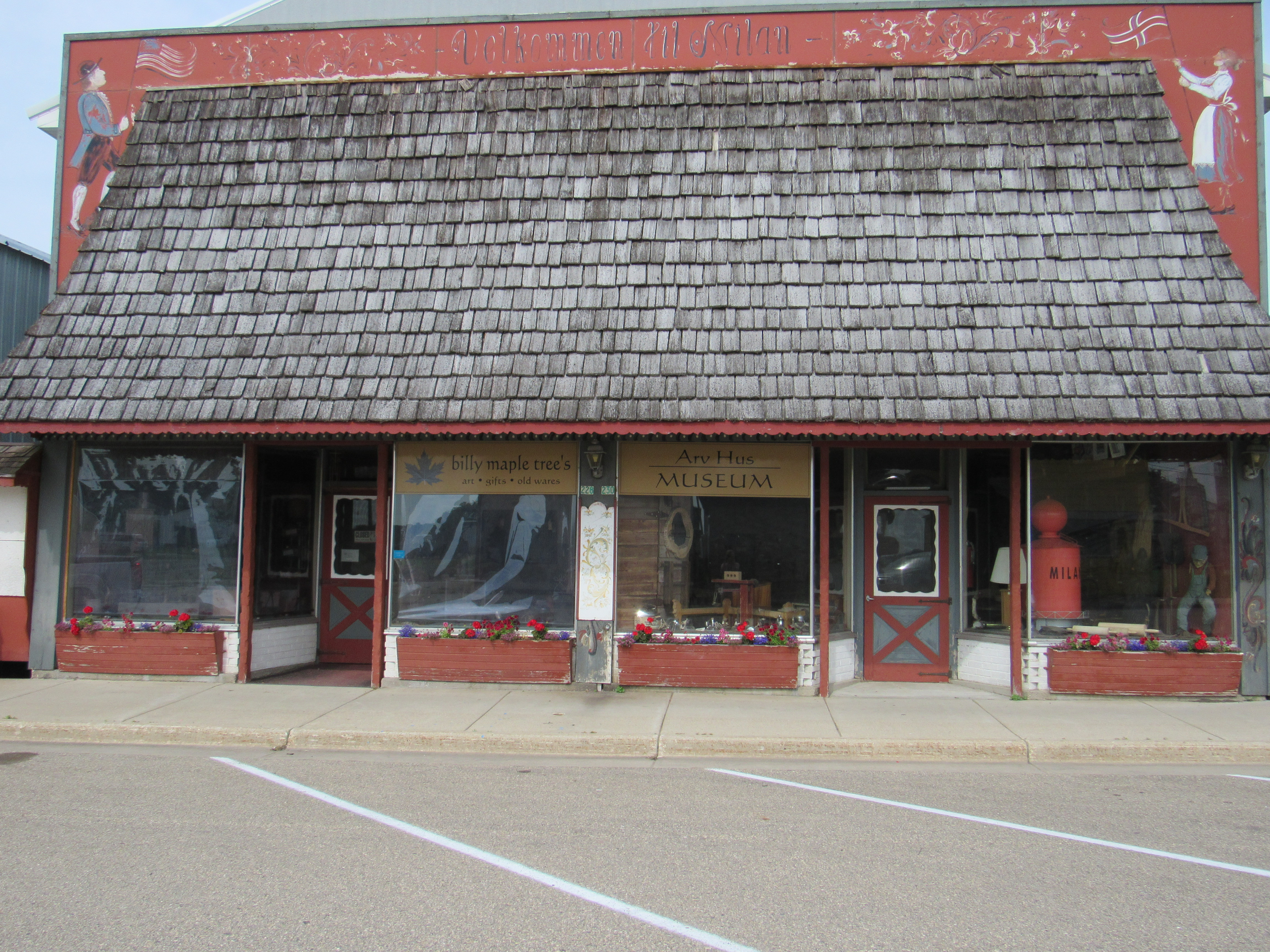
- Street facade of Museum
- Established: 1984
- Location: 228 Main Street, Milan, Minnesota 56262, United States
- Coordinates: 45.111389°N 95.911667°W
- Type: Local history

The Arv Hus Museum is a cultural heritage center located in Milan, Minnesota. Established in 1984, the museum's name translates from Norwegian to "Heritage House." The Arv Hus Museum showcases the artistic traditions brought by Norwegian immigrants and local history of the region, with a particular focus on Norwegian Rosemaling, a decorative painting technique.

The museum was established in 1984 by Billy Thompson who started the museum in a building that was once a harness shop run by Thompson's great-grandfather.

== Milan Arv Hus Society ==
The non-profit organization Milan Arv Hus Society serves as the governing body, overseeing the museum's operations, collection care, and educational programming. The society plays a crucial role in fundraising, ensuring the museum's continued success in preserving and sharing the stories of the past.

== Educational Programming and Collections ==
The museum contains a collection of vintage photographs and artifacts in rough-cut frames made from local wood, and stories and items from early settlers in the Milan area. Exhibits use items from both privately owned sources and items donated to the organization. The museum also displays the sawdust artwork of its founder, Thompson.

The museum's collection features works by world-renowned Norwegian Rosemalers, including intricate floral designs on a variety of objects. Visitors can also view a mural by Augsburg artist Phillip Thompson alongside other exhibits that explore the cultural heritage of the area. The Arv Hus Museum offers a glimpse into the lives of early settlers and the traditions they brought with them.

== See also ==
- List of museums in Minnesota
