= Waseca County Historical Society Museum =

Museum in Lonsdale, Minnesota

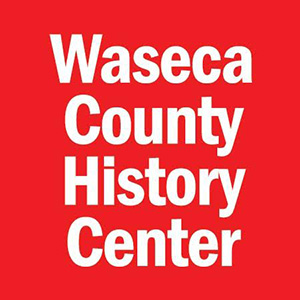

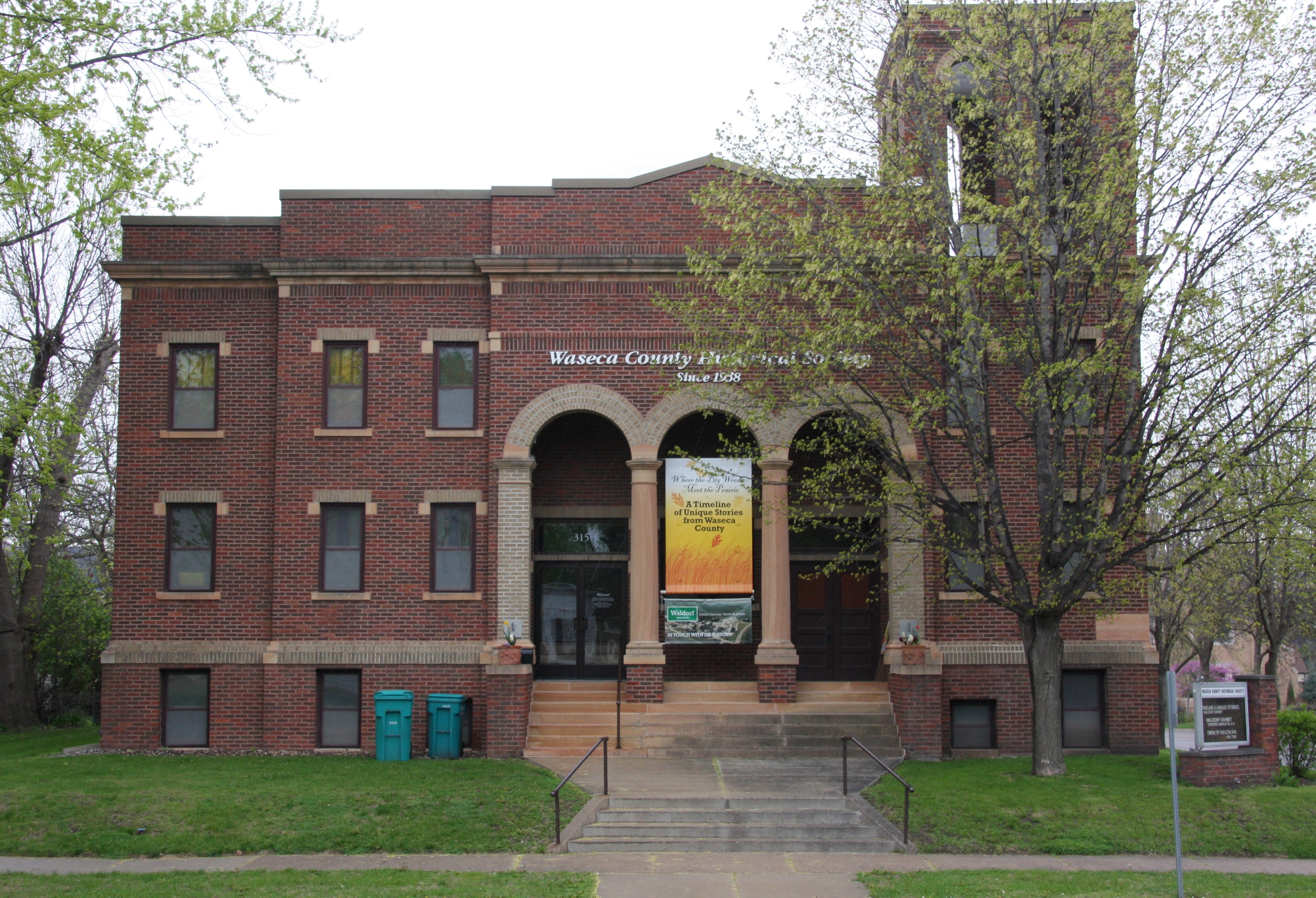
- Museum in 2016
- Established: 1964
- Location: 315 2nd Ave NE Waseca, Minnesota, United States
- Coordinates: 44°04′43″N 93°30′13″W
- Type: Local History
- Executive director: Joan Mooney

The Waseca County Historical Society Museum, also known as the Waseca County History Center, is a local history museum located in Waseca, Minnesota, and operated by the Waseca County Historical Society. Founded in 1938, the museum is dedicated to preserving and interpreting the rich history of Waseca County, established in 1857.

== History ==
The inception of the Waseca County Historical Society dates back to 1938 when early artifact donations were showcased in a space within the basement of the Waseca County courthouse. As the demand for more space grew in the mid-fifties, the society had to relocate the cabin to the Waseca County fairgrounds, where it was housed in a cement block building known as Hodgson Hall. In 1962, local citizen Edgar Johnson and his family purchased the former Methodist Church building, which was later renovated and donated by the Johnson family to become the official Waseca County Museum in 1964.

== Exhibits ==
The museum features a variety of exhibits on the main floor and balcony. The permanent exhibit, "The Timeline of Unique Stories from Waseca County," showcases over 150 years of county history through panels and display cases. Visitors can explore the stories of the people who settled the area, the events that shaped the county, and the unique character of Waseca County.

== Research facilities and collections ==
In addition to the museum exhibits, the Waseca County Historical Society also maintains the Bailey-Lewer Research Library. This library provides resources for those interested in researching their family history or learning more about Waseca County's past. The library collection includes photographs, an atlas, and even the original 1857 Waseca County Minutes. The Society maintains an archive that includes over 37,000 artifact records, 17,000 photographs, and 350,000 archived records. This collection encompasses historical documents, family histories, oral histories, and birth, death, and marriage records.

== P. C. Bailey House ==
The Waseca County Historical Society also manages the P. C. Bailey House, a historic home built in 1868 by Dayton Smith. Listed on the National Register of Historic Places, the Bailey House offers a glimpse into the lives of early Waseca County residents.
