= Eden Township, Brown County, Minnesota =

Township in Minnesota, United States

Eden Township
- Township
- Location within the state of Minnesota Eden Township (the United States)
- Coordinates: 44°25′12″N 94°48′56″W
- Country: United States
- State: Minnesota
- County: Brown

Area
  - Total: 41.5 sq mi (107.6 km^{2})
  - Land: 41.3 sq mi (107.0 km^{2})
  - Water: 0.19 sq mi (0.5 km^{2})
- Elevation: 1,020 ft (311 m)

Population (2000)
  - Total: 321
  - Density: 7.8/sq mi (3/km^{2})
- Time zone: UTC-6 (Central (CST))
  - Summer (DST): UTC-5 (CDT)
- FIPS code: 27-18026
- GNIS feature ID: 0664041

Eden Township is a township in Brown County, Minnesota, United States. The population was 321 as of the 2000 census.

== History ==
Eden Township was organized in 1867. The name is an allusion to the Garden of Eden.

== Geography ==
According to the United States Census Bureau, the township has a total area of 41.5 square miles (107 km^{2}), of which 41.3 square miles (107 km^{2}) is land and 0.2 square miles (0.52 km^{2}) (0.51%) is water.

=== Major highway ===
- Minnesota State Highway 68

=== Lakes ===
- Indian Lake
- Lone Tree Lake

=== Adjacent townships ===
- Camp Township, Renville County (north)
- Ridgely Township, Nicollet County (east)
- Home Township (southeast)
- Prairieville Township (south)
- Brookville Township, Redwood County (southwest)
- Morgan Township, Redwood County (west)
- Birch Cooley Township, Renville County (northwest)
- Sherman Township, Redwood County (northwest)

=== Cemeteries ===
The township includes the following cemeteries: Eden, Immanuel, Mount Hope and Zion.

== Demographics ==
As of the census of 2000, there were 321 people, 123 households, and 93 families residing in the township. The population density was 7.8 people per square mile (3.0/km^{2}). There were 132 housing units at an average density of 3.2/sq mi (1.2/km^{2}). The racial makeup of the township was 98.13% White, 0.31% African American, 1.25% from other races, and 0.31% from two or more races. Hispanic or Latino of any race were 1.25% of the population.

There were 123 households, out of which 29.3% had children under the age of 18 living with them, 63.4% were married couples living together, 4.1% had a female householder with no husband present, and 23.6% were non-families. 21.1% of all households were made up of individuals, and 6.5% had someone living alone who was 65 years of age or older. The average household size was 2.61 and the average family size was 3.00.

In the township the population was spread out, with 22.4% under the age of 18, 11.8% from 18 to 24, 24.9% from 25 to 44, 24.6% from 45 to 64, and 16.2% who were 65 years of age or older. The median age was 40 years. For every 100 females, there were 134.3 males. For every 100 females age 18 and over, there were 128.4 males.

The median income for a household in the township was $53,036, and the median income for a family was $57,250. Males had a median income of $29,821 versus $19,750 for females. The per capita income for the township was $22,425. About 2.2% of families and 3.2% of the population were below the poverty line, including none of those under age 18 and 9.1% of those age 65 or over.
