= Lamberton Township, Redwood County, Minnesota =

Lamberton Township, Minnesota
- Township
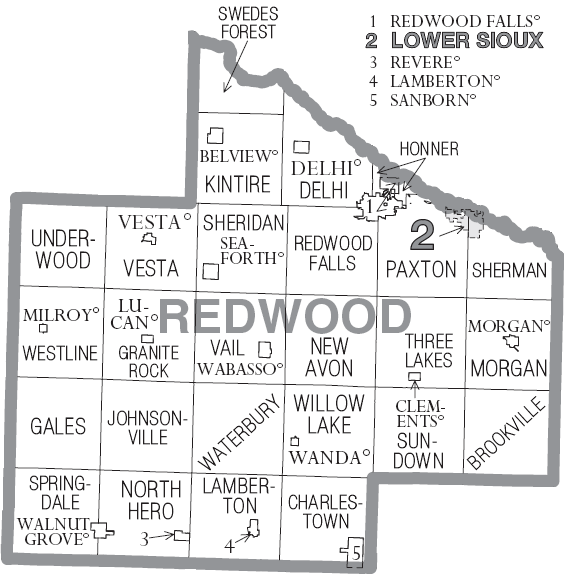
- Cities and townships of Redwood County
- Coordinates: 44°14′8″N 95°17′6″W
- Country: United States
- State: Minnesota
- County: Redwood

Area
  - Total: 35.4 sq mi (91.7 km^{2})
  - Land: 35.4 sq mi (91.7 km^{2})
  - Water: 0 sq mi (0.0 km^{2})
- Elevation: 1,138 ft (347 m)

Population (2000)
  - Total: 235
  - Density: 6.7/sq mi (2.6/km^{2})
- Time zone: UTC-6 (Central (CST))
  - Summer (DST): UTC-5 (CDT)
- ZIP code: 56152
- Area code: 507
- FIPS code: 27-35306
- GNIS feature ID: 0664716

Lamberton Township is one of the twenty-six townships of Redwood County, Minnesota, United States. The population was 235 at the 2000 census.

Lamberton Township was organized in 1874, and named for Henry Wilson Lamberton.

== Geography ==
According to the United States Census Bureau, the township has a total area of 35.4 square miles (92 km^{2}), of which 35.4 square miles (92 km^{2}) is land and 0.04 square miles (0.10 km^{2}) (0.06%) is water.

The city of Lamberton is located in Lamberton Township.

== Demographics ==
As of the census of 2000, there were 235 people, 83 households, and 65 families residing in the township. The population density was 6.6 inhabitants per square mile (2.5/km^{2}). There were 88 housing units at an average density of 2.5 per square mile (0.97/km^{2}). The racial makeup of the township was 100.00% White.

There were 83 households, out of which 37.3% had children under the age of 18 living with them, 73.5% were married couples living together, and 20.5% were non-families. 16.9% of all households were made up of individuals, and 3.6% had someone living alone who was 65 years of age or older. The average household size was 2.83 and the average family size was 3.21.

In the township the population was spread out, with 31.5% under the age of 18, 4.3% from 18 to 24, 26.8% from 25 to 44, 24.3% from 45 to 64, and 13.2% who were 65 years of age or older. The median age was 37 years. For every 100 females, there were 117.6 males. For every 100 females age 18 and over, there were 130.0 males.

The median income for a household in the township was $34,286, and the median income for a family was $41,667. Males had a median income of $27,857 versus $18,750 for females. The per capita income for the township was $15,914. About 5.7% of families and 7.3% of the population were below the poverty line, including 9.0% of those under the age of 18 and none of those 65 or over.
