= Willow Lake Township, Redwood County, Minnesota =

Willow Lake Township, Minnesota
- Township
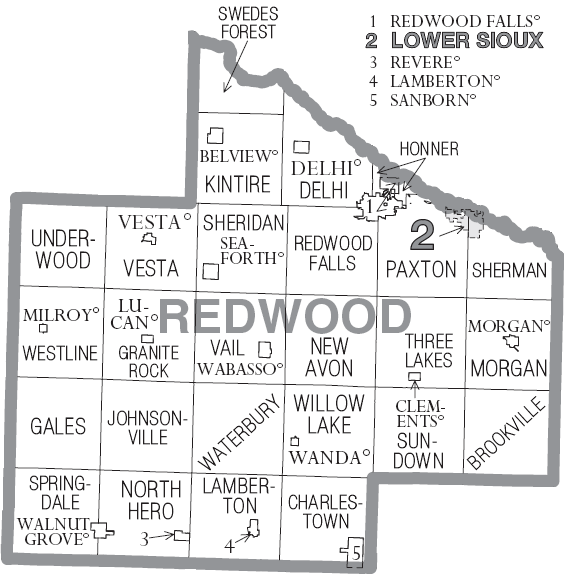
- Cities and townships of Redwood County
- Coordinates: 44°19′40″N 95°9′47″W
- Country: United States
- State: Minnesota
- County: Redwood

Area
  - Total: 36.1 sq mi (93.4 km^{2})
  - Land: 35.9 sq mi (92.9 km^{2})
  - Water: 0.19 sq mi (0.5 km^{2})
- Elevation: 1,070 ft (326 m)

Population (2000)
  - Total: 247
  - Density: 7.0/sq mi (2.7/km^{2})
- Time zone: UTC-6 (Central (CST))
  - Summer (DST): UTC-5 (CDT)
- FIPS code: 27-70474
- GNIS feature ID: 0666001

Willow Lake Township is one of the twenty-six townships of Redwood County, Minnesota, United States. The population was 247 at the 2000 census.

Willow Lake Township was organized in 1871, and named for a former lake near Wanda.

== Geography ==
According to the United States Census Bureau, the township has a total area of 36.1 square miles (93.4 km^{2}); 35.9 square miles (92.9 km^{2}) is land and 0.2 square mile (0.5 km^{2}) (0.50%) is water.

The city of Wanda is located in Willow Lake Township.

== Demographics ==
As of the census of 2000, there were 247 people, 83 households, and 65 families residing in the township. The population density was 6.9 people per square mile (2.7/km^{2}). There were 87 housing units at an average density of 2.4/sq mi (0.9/km^{2}). The racial makeup of the township was 99.60% White, and 0.40% from two or more races. Hispanic or Latino of any race were 0.81% of the population.

There were 83 households, out of which 42.2% had children under the age of 18 living with them, 71.1% were married couples living together, 3.6% had a female householder with no husband present, and 20.5% were non-families. 19.3% of all households were made up of individuals, and 15.7% had someone living alone who was 65 years of age or older. The average household size was 2.98 and the average family size was 3.45.

In the township the population was spread out, with 32.0% under the age of 18, 7.7% from 18 to 24, 24.7% from 25 to 44, 23.5% from 45 to 64, and 12.1% who were 65 years of age or older. The median age was 36 years. For every 100 females, there were 104.1 males. For every 100 females age 18 and over, there were 110.0 males.

The median income for a household in the township was $45,000, and the median income for a family was $46,563. Males had a median income of $22,396 versus $18,750 for females. The per capita income for the township was $14,050. About 9.1% of families and 14.0% of the population were below the poverty line, including 20.0% of those under the age of eighteen and 28.6% of those 65 or over.
