= Charlestown Township =

Charlestown Township may refer to:

- Charlestown Township, Clark County, Indiana
- Charlestown Township, Redwood County, Minnesota
- Charlestown Township, Portage County, Ohio
- Charlestown Township, Chester County, Pennsylvania

== See also ==
- Charleston Township (disambiguation)
