= John St. George Honner =

American politician

John St. George "J.S.G." Honner (May 21, 1831 – June 21, 1888) was an American farmer, businessman, and politician.

Born in New York, Honner moved with his parents to Canada and then Michigan. In 1856, Honner moved to Iosco Township, Waseca County, Minnesota Territory. While in Iosco Township, Honner served on the Waseca County Board of Commissioners. In 1862, Honner moved to Redwood County, Minnesota. Honner was a farmer and owned North Redwood Granite Works. He also served on the Redwood County Board of Commissioners and was the county register of deeds. He was also assessor of the Honner Township which was named for him. In 1866 and 1871, Honner served in the Minnesota House of Representatives and then in the Minnesota Senate in 1873 and 1874. Honner also served as Redwood County treasurer. He died at his home in North Redwood, Minnesota.

In 1980, Honner's home was added to the National Register of Historic Places as the Honner-Hosken House.
