= Johnsonville Township =

Johnsonville Township may refer to the following townships in the United States:

- Johnsonville Township, Harnett County, North Carolina
- Johnsonville Township, Redwood County, Minnesota
