= Vesta Township, Redwood County, Minnesota =

Vesta Township, Minnesota
- Township
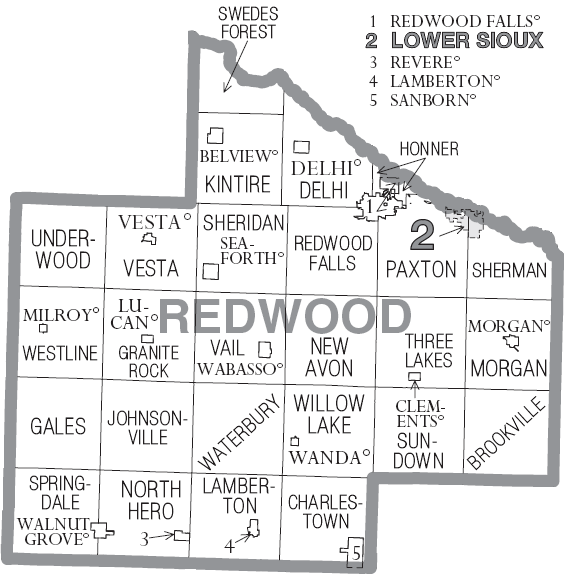
- Cities and townships of Redwood County
- Coordinates: 44°30′38″N 95°24′7″W
- Country: United States
- State: Minnesota
- County: Redwood

Area
  - Total: 34.9 sq mi (90.4 km^{2})
  - Land: 34.8 sq mi (90.2 km^{2})
  - Water: 0.077 sq mi (0.2 km^{2})
- Elevation: 1,037 ft (316 m)

Population (2000)
  - Total: 206
  - Density: 6.0/sq mi (2.3/km^{2})
- Time zone: UTC-6 (Central (CST))
  - Summer (DST): UTC-5 (CDT)
- ZIP codes: 56287, 56292
- Area code: 507
- FIPS code: 27-67000
- GNIS feature ID: 0665867

Vesta Township is one of the twenty-six townships of Redwood County, Minnesota, United States. The population was 206 at the 2000 census.

Vesta Township was organized in 1880, and named after Vesta, Roman goddess of the hearth and home.

== Geography ==
According to the United States Census Bureau, the township has a total area of 34.9 square miles (90.4 km^{2}), of which 34.8 square miles (90.2 km^{2}) is land and 0.1 square mile (0.2 km^{2}) (0.23%) is water.

The city of Vesta is located in Vesta Township.

== Demographics ==
As of the census of 2000, there were 206 people, 69 households, and 56 families residing in the township. The population density was 5.9 people per square mile (2.3/km^{2}). There were 78 housing units at an average density of 2.2/sq mi (0.9/km^{2}). The racial makeup of the township was 100.00% White.

There were 69 households, out of which 40.6% had children under the age of 18 living with them, 76.8% were married couples living together, 4.3% had a female householder with no husband present, and 18.8% were non-families. 15.9% of all households were made up of individuals, and 8.7% had someone living alone who was 65 years of age or older. The average household size was 2.99 and the average family size was 3.38.

In the township the population was spread out, with 34.0% under the age of 18, 4.4% from 18 to 24, 29.1% from 25 to 44, 19.9% from 45 to 64, and 12.6% who were 65 years of age or older. The median age was 37 years. For every 100 females, there were 114.6 males. For every 100 females age 18 and over, there were 119.4 males.

The median income for a household in the township was $44,583, and the median income for a family was $54,375. Males had a median income of $28,333 versus $22,500 for females. The per capita income for the township was $18,247. About 3.5% of families and 4.6% of the population were below the poverty line, including none of those under the age of eighteen and 5.4% of those 65 or over.
