= Delhi Township =

Delhi Township may refer to the following places in the United States:

- Delhi Township, Delaware County, Iowa
- Delhi Charter Township, Michigan
- Delhi Township, Minnesota
- Delhi Township, Ohio
