= Granite Rock Township, Redwood County, Minnesota =

Granite Rock Township, Minnesota
- Township
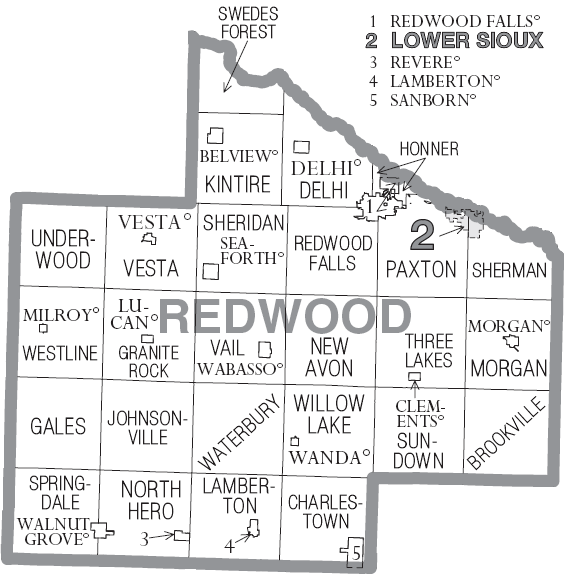
- Cities and townships of Redwood County
- Coordinates: 44°25′16″N 95°25′16″W
- Country: United States
- State: Minnesota
- County: Redwood

Area
  - Total: 36.3 sq mi (94.1 km^{2})
  - Land: 36.3 sq mi (94.1 km^{2})
  - Water: 0.039 sq mi (0.1 km^{2})
- Elevation: 1,089 ft (332 m)

Population (2000)
  - Total: 241
  - Density: 6.7/sq mi (2.6/km^{2})
- Time zone: UTC-6 (Central (CST))
  - Summer (DST): UTC-5 (CDT)
- FIPS code: 27-25316
- GNIS feature ID: 0664326

Granite Rock Township is one of the twenty-six townships of Redwood County, Minnesota, United States. The population was 241 at the 2000 census.

Granite Rock Township was organized in 1890, and named for the granite rock formations in the Redwood River valley.

== Geography ==
According to the United States Census Bureau, the township has a total area of 36.3 square miles (94 km^{2}), of which 36.3 square miles (94 km^{2}) is land and 0.04 square miles (0.10 km^{2}) (0.05%) is water.

Per its name, Granite Rock Township contains deposits of granite, a rock composed of three different major minerals.

The city of Lucan is located in Granite Rock Township.

== Demographics ==
As of the census of 2000, there were 241 people, 78 households, and 64 families residing in the township. The population density was 6.6 inhabitants per square mile (2.5/km^{2}). There were 87 housing units at an average density of 2.4 per square mile (0.93/km^{2}). The racial makeup of the township was 100.00% White.

There were 78 households, out of which 44.9% had children under the age of 18 living with them, 73.1% were married couples living together, 3.8% had a female householder with no husband present, and 17.9% were non-families. 14.1% of all households were made up of individuals, and 2.6% had someone living alone who was 65 years of age or older. The average household size was 3.09 and the average family size was 3.44.

In the township the population was spread out, with 35.3% under the age of 18, 8.7% from 18 to 24, 22.0% from 25 to 44, 24.1% from 45 to 64, and 10.0% who were 65 years of age or older. The median age was 33 years. For every 100 females, there were 115.2 males. For every 100 females age 18 and over, there were 116.7 males.

The median income for a household in the township was $35,000, and the median income for a family was $37,250. Males had a median income of $30,625 versus $20,500 for females. The per capita income for the township was $12,631. About 8.2% of families and 12.1% of the population were below the poverty line, including 15.0% of those under the age of eighteen and 6.5% of those 65 or over.
