= Honner Township, Redwood County, Minnesota =

Honner Township, Minnesota
- Township
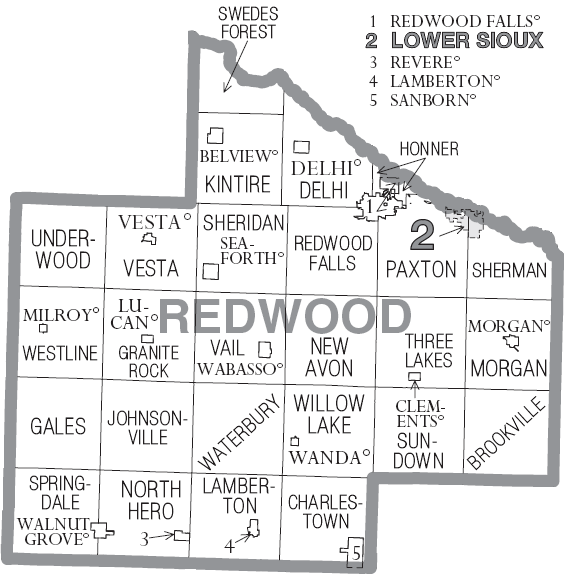
- Cities and townships of Redwood County
- Coordinates: 44°33′33″N 95°5′16″W
- Country: United States
- State: Minnesota
- County: Redwood

Area
  - Total: 4.1 sq mi (10.7 km^{2})
  - Land: 4.1 sq mi (10.5 km^{2})
  - Water: 0.077 sq mi (0.2 km^{2})
- Elevation: 840 ft (256 m)

Population (2000)
  - Total: 86
  - Density: 21/sq mi (8.2/km^{2})
- Time zone: UTC-6 (Central (CST))
  - Summer (DST): UTC-5 (CDT)
- FIPS code: 27-30068
- GNIS feature ID: 0664516

Honner Township was previously one of the twenty-six townships of Redwood County, Minnesota, United States. The population was 86 at the 2000 census.

== History ==
Honner Township was organized in 1880, and named in honor of John St. George Honner, a state legislator. As of August 1, 2022, Honner Township was officially dissolved with all lands therein becoming part of neighboring Paxton Township.

== Geography ==
According to the United States Census Bureau, the township has a total area of 4.2 square miles (11 km^{2}), of which 4.1 square miles (11 km^{2}) is land and 0.1 square miles (0.26 km^{2}) (1.93%) is water.

Most of what was Honner Township is now occupied by the city of Redwood Falls, the county seat of Redwood County.

== Demographics ==
As of the census of 2000, there were 86 people, 29 households, and 24 families residing in the township. The population density was 21.2 inhabitants per square mile (8.2/km^{2}). There were 30 housing units at an average density of 7.4 per square mile (2.9/km^{2}). The racial makeup of the township was 98.84% White, and 1.16% from two or more races.

There were 29 households, out of which 41.4% had children under the age of 18 living with them, 72.4% were married couples living together, 10.3% had a female householder with no husband present, and 13.8% were non-families. 3.4% of all households were made up of individuals, and none had someone living alone who was 65 years of age or older. The average household size was 2.76 and the average family size was 2.92.

In the township the population was spread out, with 27.9% under the age of 18, 3.5% from 18 to 24, 26.7% from 25 to 44, 36.0% from 45 to 64, and 5.8% who were 65 years of age or older. The median age was 42 years. For every 100 females, there were 95.5 males. For every 100 females age 18 and over, there were 100.0 males.

The median income for a household in the township was $51,250, and the median income for a family was $52,083. Males had a median income of $42,250 versus $18,125 for females. The per capita income for the township was $21,988. There were no families and 11.2% of the population living below the poverty line, including no under eighteens and none of those over 64.
