= Westline Township, Redwood County, Minnesota =

Westline Township, Minnesota
- Township
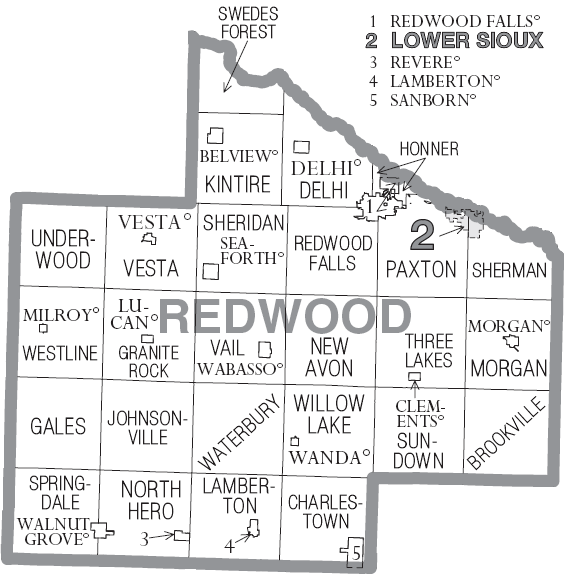
- Cities and townships of Redwood County
- Coordinates: 44°24′24″N 95°31′23″W
- Country: United States
- State: Minnesota
- County: Redwood

Area
  - Total: 35.9 sq mi (93.1 km^{2})
  - Land: 35.8 sq mi (92.7 km^{2})
  - Water: 0.15 sq mi (0.4 km^{2})
- Elevation: 1,096 ft (334 m)

Population (2000)
  - Total: 203
  - Density: 5.7/sq mi (2.2/km^{2})
- Time zone: UTC-6 (Central (CST))
  - Summer (DST): UTC-5 (CDT)
- FIPS code: 27-69538
- GNIS feature ID: 0665967

Westline Township is one of the twenty-six townships of Redwood County, Minnesota, United States. The population was 203 at the 2000 census.

Westline Township was organized in 1878, and named for its location near the western county line.

== Geography ==
According to the United States Census Bureau, the township has a total area of 36.0 square miles (93.1 km^{2}), of which 35.8 square miles (92.7 km^{2}) is land and 0.2 square mile (0.4 km^{2}) (0.45%) is water.

The city of Milroy is located in Westline Township.

== Demographics ==
As of the census of 2000, there were 203 people, 72 households, and 65 families residing in the township. The population density was 5.7 people per square mile (2.2/km^{2}). There were 81 housing units at an average density of 2.3/sq mi (0.9/km^{2}). The racial makeup of the township was 100.00% White.

There were 72 households, out of which 38.9% had children under the age of 18 living with them, 81.9% were married couples living together, 4.2% had a female householder with no husband present, and 9.7% were non-families. 9.7% of all households were made up of individuals, and 4.2% had someone living alone who was 65 years of age or older. The average household size was 2.82 and the average family size was 3.02.

In the township the population was spread out, with 29.6% under the age of 18, 3.9% from 18 to 24, 26.1% from 25 to 44, 27.1% from 45 to 64, and 13.3% who were 65 years of age or older. The median age was 39 years. For every 100 females, there were 105.1 males. For every 100 females age 18 and over, there were 113.4 males.

The median income for a household in the township was $41,250, and the median income for a family was $42,143. Males had a median income of $25,625 versus $16,964 for females. The per capita income for the township was $16,764. About 9.5% of families and 11.2% of the population were below the poverty line, including 8.8% of those under the age of eighteen and none of those 65 or over.
