= Underwood Township, Redwood County, Minnesota =

Underwood Township, Minnesota
- Township
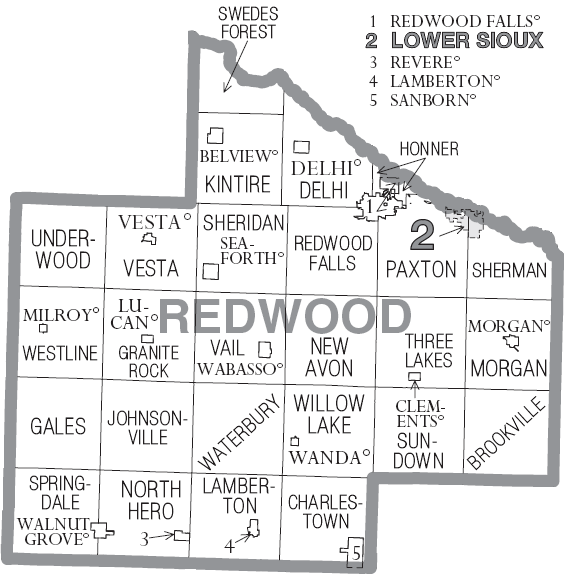
- Cities and townships of Redwood County
- Coordinates: 44°30′2″N 95°31′28″W
- Country: United States
- State: Minnesota
- County: Redwood

Area
  - Total: 35.0 sq mi (90.7 km^{2})
  - Land: 35.0 sq mi (90.6 km^{2})
  - Water: 0.039 sq mi (0.1 km^{2})
- Elevation: 1,056 ft (322 m)

Population (2000)
  - Total: 215
  - Density: 6.2/sq mi (2.4/km^{2})
- Time zone: UTC-6 (Central (CST))
  - Summer (DST): UTC-5 (CDT)
- FIPS code: 27-66190
- GNIS feature ID: 0665838

Underwood Township is one of the twenty-six townships of Redwood County, Minnesota, United States. The population was 215 at the 2000 census.

Underwood Township was organized in 1876.

== Geography ==
According to the United States Census Bureau, the township has a total area of 35.0 square miles (90.6 km^{2}) of which 35.0 square miles (90.6 km^{2}) is land and 0.04 square miles (0.1 km^{2}) (0.06%) is water.

No municipalities are located in Underwood Township.

== Demographics ==
At the 2000 census there were 215 people, 73 households and 61 families residing in the township. The population density was 6.1 per square mile (2.4/km^{2}). There were 76 housing units at an average density of 2.2/sq mi (0.8/km^{2}). The racial makeup of the township was 98.14% White, 0.93% African American and 0.93% Native American.

There were 73 households, of which 43.8% had children under the age of 18 living with them, 72.6% were married couples living together, 1.4% had a female householder with no husband present, and 15.1% were non-families. 9.6% of all households were made up of individuals, and 5.5% had someone living alone who was 65 years of age or older. The average household size was 2.95 and the average family size was 3.21.

32.6% of the population were under the age of 18, 9.3% from 18 to 24, 30.7% from 25 to 44, 17.2% from 45 to 64, and 10.2% who were 65 years of age or older. The median age was 32 years. For every 100 females, there were 131.2 males. For every 100 females age 18 and over, there were 133.9 males.

The median household income was $47,083 and the median family income was $49,375. Males had a median income of $30,417 and females $22,679 for females. The per capita income was $18,794. None of the population or families were below the poverty line.
