= Joe Garagiola Jr. =

American attorney and baseball executive (born 1950)

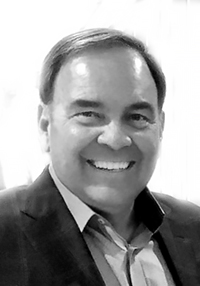
- Garagiola in 2019
- Born: Joseph Henry Garagiola Jr. August 6, 1950 (age 76); St. Louis, Missouri, U.S.
- Education: University of Notre Dame; Georgetown University Law Center
- Occupation: Major League Baseball executive
- Organization: Arizona Diamondbacks
- Parent(s): Joe Garagiola (father); Audrie Ross (mother)

Joseph Henry Garagiola Jr. (born August 6, 1950) is an attorney and special advisor to Arizona Diamondbacks president and CEO Derrick Hall and formerly the senior vice president of standards and on-field operations for Major League Baseball (MLB). Prior to that he was senior vice president of baseball operations for MLB from 2005 to 2011 and the general manager of the Diamondbacks from 1997 to 2005.

== Early life ==
He is the son of Joe Garagiola Sr., who played catcher for the St. Louis Cardinals and Pittsburgh Pirates in the late 1940s and early 1950s. In 1973, Garagiola, along with Chris Hart, appeared on the game show To Tell the Truth as impostors pretending to be police detective Richard Buggy. Garagiola's father and Hart's mother, Kitty Carlisle, were regular panelists on the show at the time and both appeared as part of a prank on their parents. He is an alumnus of Archbishop Stepinac High School, the University of Notre Dame and Georgetown University Law Center.

== General manager ==
In the 1990s, Maricopa county supervisor Jim Bruner discussed the idea of putting in a bid for an expansion team in Major League Baseball to play in Arizona with his friend Joe Garagiola Jr., who at the time was a Phoenix sports attorney. In 1993, they set up a meeting with Jerry Colangelo, who at the time was owner of the Phoenix Suns; Colangelo liked the idea enough to serve as the spearhead for assembling a group to fundraise the money required (over $125 million) while also serving to help with public financing a downtown baseball stadium, which later came to be known as Chase Field.

On March 9, 1995, the city of Phoenix was awarded a franchise by Major League Baseball for play in the 1998 season. Colangelo served as managing general partner while hiring Garagiola to serve as general manager in 1995 (Colangelo also hired the first manager in Buck Showalter). Arizona fielded a short-season farm team after the draft in June of 1996 before fielding further teams by the end of 1998. The Diamondbacks participated in the 1997 Major League Baseball expansion draft on November 18. The day prior to the expansion draft, the team signed Jay Bell to a $34 million contract across five years. This was the first of several moves made to spend on a winner as soon as possible, to the point where they asked players to take deferred salaries, which they would defer for a couple of years to be repaid later. Garagiola oversaw the 35 selections for his team. Upon losing the coin toss for the first pick, the Diamondbacks selected Brian Anderson as the second overall pick. In December of 1998, the team added Randy Johnson on a five-year contract of $52 million. In July 2000, they acquired Curt Schilling from the Philadelphia Phillies in a trade.

In eight seasons as general manager, the Diamondbacks had five straight winning seasons, which included winning 100 games in their second year as a team in 1999 and a world championship in 2001. However, consecutive losing seasons in 2004 (111 losses) and 2005 mired the team for years to come financially.

Sporting positions
Preceded by Franchise established	Arizona Diamondbacks General Manager; 1997–2005	Succeeded by Bob Gebhard (interim)
