= Bob Gebhard =

American baseball player (born 1943)

- Pitcher
- Born: January 3, 1943 (age 83); Lamberton, Minnesota, U.S.
- Batted: Right Threw: Right

MLB debut
- August 2, 1971, for the Minnesota Twins

Last MLB appearance
- September 3, 1974, for the Montreal Expos

MLB statistics
- Win–loss record: 1–3
- Earned run average: 5.93
- Strikeouts: 26
- Stats at Baseball Reference

Teams
- Minnesota Twins (1971–1972); Montreal Expos (1974)

Robert Henry Gebhard (born January 3, 1943) is an American retired front-office executive in Major League Baseball and a former right-handed pitcher for the Minnesota Twins and Montreal Expos. He was the first general manager in the history of the Colorado Rockies of the National League, serving from 1992, the year before the Rockies made their MLB debut, until his resignation near the end of the 1999 season.

== Career ==
=== As a player ===
Born in Lamberton, Minnesota, Gebhard attended the University of Iowa. During his playing career, he stood 6 ft 2 in (1.88 m) tall, weighed 210 pounds (95 kg), and batted right-handed. Gebhard was selected by the Twins in the 44th round of the first-ever baseball amateur draft in 1965, but he didn't reach the Twins until the age of 28, on August 2, 1971, when he hurled two scoreless innings against the Chicago White Sox. He appeared in 30 games over the 1971 and 1972 seasons with Minnesota, then was signed as a free agent by the Expos in January 1974. He appeared in one game for Montreal on September 3, 1974, giving up one earned run and five hits in two innings pitched. All told, Gebhard compiled a record of one win, three defeats and an earned run average of 5.93 over 31 games and 41 innings of Major League play.

=== In the front office ===
Gebhard's front office career began with the Expos in 1976 as field director of minor league operations. He was a coach on the Expos' Major League staff in 1982, and then served as the club's farm system director from 1983 to 1986. He then returned to the Twins to become assistant general manager under Andy MacPhail, working with Minnesota during its 1987 and 1991 world championship seasons, before becoming the first GM in Rockies' history during the 1991–92 offseason.

He supervised the building of the Rockies' farm system during 1992, ran the expansion draft for them, and hired Don Baylor as the club's first manager. The early years of the Rockies were successful at the gate and on the field. In 1993, they set a Major League attendance record of 4.483 million fans in their maiden season at Mile High Stadium, led both leagues in attendance four times, and drew over 3.2 million fans every year during Gebhard's tenure. They also enjoyed three consecutive winning seasons from 1995 to 1997, and a National League wild card playoff appearance in 1995. However, successive losing campaigns in 1998–99, amplified by the Rockies' pitching staff's struggles at Coors Field, resulted in rampant speculation in late 1999 that Gebhard would be replaced as general manager. In response, he turned in his resignation on August 20.

Gebhard then moved to the St. Louis Cardinals as vice president and top assistant to general manager Walt Jocketty from 2000 to 2004, then joined the Arizona Diamondbacks as interim general manager between Joe Garagiola Jr. and Josh Byrnes from August to October 2005. He then was the D-Backs' vice president and assistant to the general manager for several years before returning to the Cardinals as special assistant to GM John Mozeliak in 2016. Gebhard retired in 2020 after a 55-year career in professional baseball.

Sporting positions
Preceded by Franchise established	Colorado Rockies General Manager; 1992–1999	Succeeded by Dan O'Dowd
Preceded by Joe Garagiola Jr.	Arizona Diamondbacks General Manager; August 7, 2005 – October 28, 2005	Succeeded by Josh Byrnes
