= Charleston Township =

Charleston Township may refer to:

- Charleston Township, Coles County, Illinois
- Charleston Township, Lee County, Iowa
- Charleston Township, Michigan
- Charleston Township, Pennsylvania

== See also ==
- Charlestown Township (disambiguation)
