= Morgan Township, Redwood County, Minnesota =

Morgan Township, Minnesota
- Township
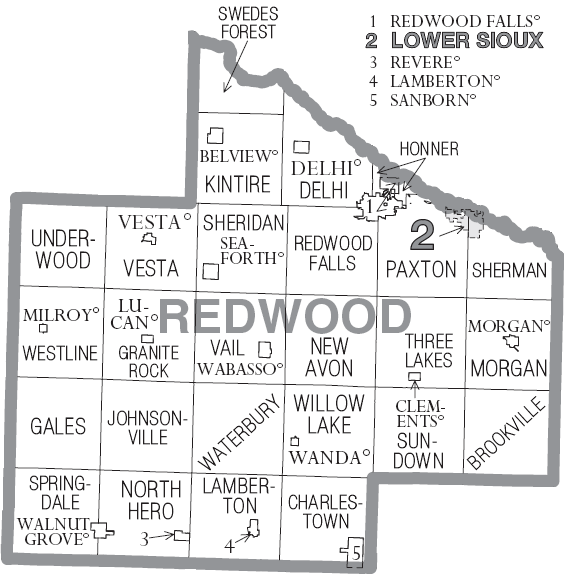
- Cities and townships of Redwood County
- Coordinates: 44°24′15″N 94°55′11″W
- Country: United States
- State: Minnesota
- County: Redwood

Area
  - Total: 35.5 sq mi (91.9 km^{2})
  - Land: 35.5 sq mi (91.9 km^{2})
  - Water: 0 sq mi (0.0 km^{2})
- Elevation: 1,050 ft (320 m)

Population (2000)
  - Total: 305
  - Density: 8.5/sq mi (3.3/km^{2})
- Time zone: UTC-6 (Central (CST))
  - Summer (DST): UTC-5 (CDT)
- ZIP code: 56266
- Area code: 507
- FIPS code: 27-44134
- GNIS feature ID: 0665034

Morgan Township is one of the twenty-six townships of Redwood County, Minnesota, United States. The population was 305 at the 2000 census.

Morgan Township was organized in 1880, and named for Lewis H. Morgan (1818-1881), an American politician and anthropologist.

== Geography ==
According to the United States Census Bureau, the township has a total area of 35.5 square miles (91.9 km^{2}), all land.

The city of Morgan is located in Morgan Township.

== Demographics ==
As of the census of 2000, there were 305 people, 108 households, and 87 families residing in the township. The population density was 8.6 inhabitants per square mile (3.3/km^{2}). There were 111 housing units at an average density of 3.1 per square mile (1.2/km^{2}). The racial makeup of the township was 97.38% White, 0.98% Native American, 1.64% from other races. Hispanic or Latino of any race were 1.64% of the population.

There were 108 households, out of which 39.8% had children under the age of 18 living with them, 75.0% were married couples living together, 1.9% had a female householder with no husband present, and 19.4% were non-families. 17.6% of all households were made up of individuals, and 6.5% had someone living alone who was 65 years of age or older. The average household size was 2.82 and the average family size was 3.18.

In the township the population was spread out, with 30.8% under the age of 18, 7.5% from 18 to 24, 29.2% from 25 to 44, 20.7% from 45 to 64, and 11.8% who were 65 years of age or older. The median age was 35 years. For every 100 females, there were 108.9 males. For every 100 females age 18 and over, there were 113.1 males.

The median income for a household in the township was $32,344, and the median income for a family was $45,750. Males had a median income of $28,750 versus $22,500 for females. The per capita income for the township was $15,950. None of the families and 0.7% of the population were living below the poverty line.
