= Rowena, Minnesota =

Rowena
- Unincorporated community
- Location within Minnesota Location within the United States
- Coordinates: 44°23′23″N 95°09′08″W
- Country: United States
- State: Minnesota
- County: Redwood
- Elevation: 1,070 ft (330 m)
- Time zone: UTC-6 (Central (CST))
  - Summer (DST): UTC-5 (CDT)
- Area code: 507
- GNIS feature ID: 654918

Rowena is an unincorporated community in Redwood County, in the U.S. state of Minnesota.

== History ==
Rowena was laid out in 1902. The community was named after the character Lady Rowena from Walter Scott's novel Ivanhoe.
