= Lower Sioux Indian Reservation =

Mdewakanton and Wahpekute bands of the Lower Sioux

Coordinates: 44°32′19″N 94°59′30″W

Lower Sioux Indian Community Caŋṡa'yapi (Dakota) Čhaŋšáyapi (Lakota)
- Indian reservation
- Location of the Lower Sioux Indian Community
- Established: 1851; 175 years ago
- Capital: Morton, Minnesota

Government
  - President: Joseph O’Brien

Area
  - Total: 2.69 sq mi (7.0 km^{2})

Population (2020)
  - Total: 534
- Demonym: Mdewakanton
- Time zone: CT
- Area code(s): 507
- Website: lowersioux.com

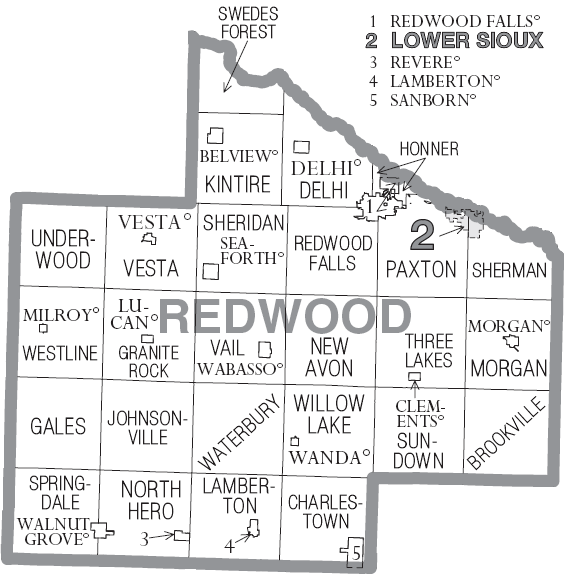
Location of Lower Sioux Indian Community in Redwood County

The Lower Sioux Indian Community, (Dakota: Caŋṡa'yapi; Lakota: Čhaŋšáyapi) also known as the Mdewakanton Tribal Reservation, is an Indian reservation located along the southern bank of the Minnesota River in Paxton and Sherman townships in Redwood County, Minnesota. Its administrative headquarters is two miles south of Morton. The reservation is located southeast of Redwood Falls, the county seat.

The area was established as part of a reservation for the Mdewakanton and Wahpekute bands of the Lower Sioux under the Treaty of Traverse des Sioux in 1851 with the federal government. It originally extended about 70 miles (110 km) along the Minnesota River and was 20 miles (30 km) wide. It was greatly reduced following the Dakota War of 1862 and various other actions. As of the 2020 census, this lower reservation had a population of 534, and a land area of 2.69 square miles (7.0 km^{2}).

== History ==
=== Forced relocation ===
After the ratification of the Treaty of Traverse de Sioux by the United States Senate in May 1853, Mdewakanton and Wahpekute bands were relocated to an East Dakota reservation on the upper Minnesota River. Included in these groups were the Red Wing Mdewakanton.

=== Termination efforts ===
From the 1940s to the 1960s, the United States government (including Congress) had a policy of terminating tribes, that is, ending the special relationships that they had with the federal government. The belief was that tribes would be selected that appeared to have adapted successfully to mainstream culture: in the process, any communal land would be distributed to individual households, and individuals would become residents of their respective counties and states, and under their jurisdiction.

Four Native American tribes (each associated with separate reservations) in Minnesota were identified for termination in the 1950s. A memo dated January 19, 1955 for the BIA issued from the Department of the Interior indicates additional terminations were being reviewed in proposed legislation for what were primarily Dakota tribes in southern Minnesota, including the Lower Sioux Community in Redwood and Scott counties, the New Upper Sioux Community in Yellow Medicine County, the Prairie Island Community in Goodhue County, and about 15 individuals living on restricted tracts in Yellow Medicine County.

Discussions between the BIA and the tribal Indians from the targeted area began in 1953 and continued throughout 1954. Though the Prairie Island and Lower Sioux communities drafted agreements for distribution of land to individual households and ownership, the Upper Sioux strongly opposed fee-simple title to communal tribal lands. On January 26, 1955, Senator Edward Thye introduced a bill (S704) to provide for termination of the tribes.

In addition to opposition by the Dakota, regional residents objected to termination, saying that county and state expenditures might increase for the areas then within reservations, and they expressed their opposition to the committee reviewing the bill. The Minnesota Governor's Commission on Human Rights also opposed the legislation, indicating that it would "not adequately protect the interests of the Indians...". The bill died in committee, never reaching the Senate floor.

=== Return of land lost in the Dakota War of 1862 ===
In 2021, the Minnesota state legislature and Minnesota Historical Society returned half of the lands to the Lower Sioux Community that were located in the former Lower Sioux Agency and were taken by the federal government as punishment after the Dakota War of 1862. This was part of their historic homeland. On February 12, 2021, the Minnesota government and Minnesota Historical Society transferred ownership of 115 acres near the historic site of the Battle of Lower Sioux Agency to the Reservation. The Minnesota Historical Society owned approximately 115 acres of land while the state government owned near 114 acres.

About the return of their lands, Lower Sioux President Robert Larsen said, "I don't know if it's ever happened before, where a state gave land back to a tribe. [Our ancestors] paid for this land over and over with their blood, with their lives. It's not a sale; it's been paid for by the ones that aren't here anymore".

== Tribal enterprises ==
The Mdewakanton tribe operates Jackpot Junction Casino Hotel, which began in 1984 as a bingo facility. The casino has become a major employer for the surrounding communities. The Lower Sioux Agency, a historic site on the reservation associated with the Dakota War of 1862, is managed by the community in partnership with the Minnesota Historical Society.

Jackpot Junction Casino Hotel was the first casino in the state of Minnesota. In addition to the gaming areas, Jackpot Junction features three bars, three restaurants, an amphitheater for live performances, and two grand ballrooms. Live music is played every weekend, usually country and occasionally rock. The casino is open 24-7 (twenty-four hours a day, seven days a week).

County Highway 2 runs through the reservation, connecting it to U.S. Route 71 and Minnesota State Highway 19 to the northwest.

== Geography ==
According to the U.S. Census Bureau, the reservation has a total area of 2.74 square miles (7.1 km^{2}), of which 2.69 square miles (7.0 km^{2}) is land and 0.05 square miles (0.13 km^{2}) is water.

The area around the reservation is primarily rural, developed in the 21st century for agricultural commodity crops of corn and soybeans. The conversion of area creeks to agricultural ditches has also altered habitat and reduced the diversity of the ecology.

== Demographics ==
As of the census of 2020, the population of the Lower Sioux Indian Reservation was 534. The population density was 198.7 inhabitants per square mile (76.7/km^{2}). There were 154 housing units at an average density of 57.3 per square mile (22.1/km^{2}). The racial makeup of the reservation was 79.6% Native American, 9.6% White, 0.2% Black or African American, 0.6% from other races, and 10.1% from two or more races. Ethnically, the population was 10.1% Hispanic or Latino of any race.

== See also ==
- Upper Sioux Indian Reservation
