= Swedes Forest Township, Redwood County, Minnesota =

Swedes Forest Township, Minnesota
- Township
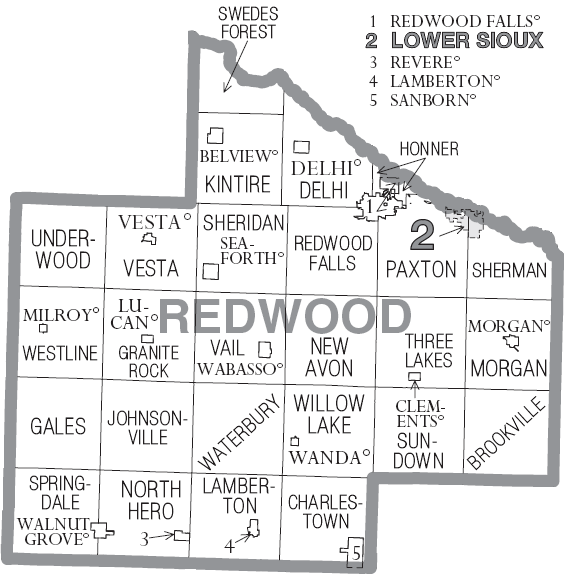
- Cities and townships of Redwood County
- Coordinates: 44°38′53″N 95°19′5″W
- Country: United States
- State: Minnesota
- County: Redwood

Area
  - Total: 19.6 sq mi (50.7 km^{2})
  - Land: 19.4 sq mi (50.3 km^{2})
  - Water: 0.15 sq mi (0.4 km^{2})
- Elevation: 1,056 ft (322 m)

Population (2000)
  - Total: 121
  - Density: 6.2/sq mi (2.4/km^{2})
- Time zone: UTC-6 (Central (CST))
  - Summer (DST): UTC-5 (CDT)
- FIPS code: 27-63868
- GNIS feature ID: 0665754

Swedes Forest Township is one of the twenty-six townships of Redwood County, Minnesota, United States. The population was 121 at the 2000 census.

Swedes Forest Township was organized in 1872. A large share of the early settlers being natives of Sweden caused the name to be selected.

== Geography ==
According to the United States Census Bureau, the township has a total area of 19.6 square miles (50.7 km^{2}), of which 19.4 square miles (50.3 km^{2}) is land and 0.1 square mile (0.4 km^{2}) (0.72%) is water.

No municipalities are located in Swedes Forest Township.

== Demographics ==
As of the census of 2000, there were 121 people, 49 households, and 34 families residing in the township. The population density was 6.2 people per square mile (2.4/km^{2}). There were 62 housing units at an average density of 3.2/sq mi (1.2/km^{2}). The racial makeup of the township was 100.00% White.

There were 49 households, out of which 30.6% had children under the age of 18 living with them, 65.3% were married couples living together, 4.1% had a female householder with no husband present, and 28.6% were non-families. 28.6% of all households were made up of individuals, and 10.2% had someone living alone who was 65 years of age or older. The average household size was 2.47 and the average family size was 3.00.

In the township the population was spread out, with 27.3% under the age of 18, 1.7% from 18 to 24, 33.1% from 25 to 44, 27.3% from 45 to 64, and 10.7% who were 65 years of age or older. The median age was 39 years. For every 100 females, there were 120.0 males. For every 100 females age 18 and over, there were 114.6 males.

The median income for a household in the township was $44,167, and the median income for a family was $51,667. Males had a median income of $26,667 versus $30,000 for females. The per capita income for the township was $18,718. There were no families and 1.9% of the population living below the poverty line, including no under eighteens and 13.3% of those over 64.
