= Three Lakes Township, Redwood County, Minnesota =

Three Lakes Township, Minnesota
- Township
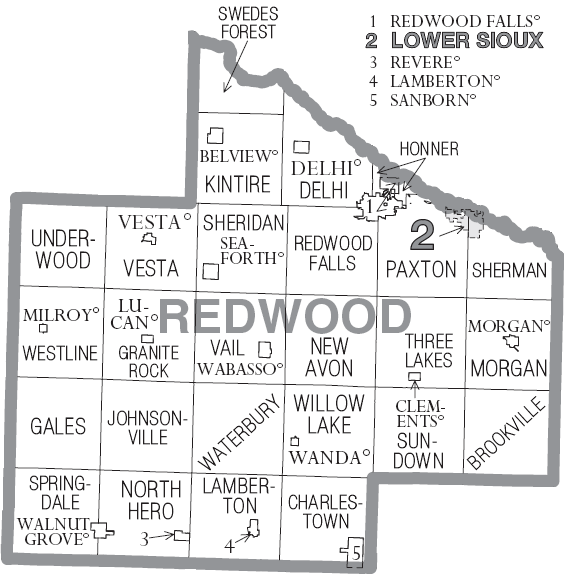
- Cities and townships of Redwood County
- Coordinates: 44°25′13″N 95°2′33″W
- Country: United States
- State: Minnesota
- County: Redwood

Area
  - Total: 35.4 sq mi (91.7 km^{2})
  - Land: 35.4 sq mi (91.7 km^{2})
  - Water: 0 sq mi (0.0 km^{2})
- Elevation: 1,050 ft (320 m)

Population (2000)
  - Total: 185
  - Density: 5.2/sq mi (2/km^{2})
- Time zone: UTC-6 (Central (CST))
  - Summer (DST): UTC-5 (CDT)
- FIPS code: 27-64822
- GNIS feature ID: 0665786

Three Lakes Township is one of the twenty-six townships of Redwood County, Minnesota, United States. The population was 185 at the 2000 census.

Three Lakes Township was organized in 1876.

== Geography ==
According to the United States Census Bureau, the township has a total area of 35.4 square miles (91.7 km^{2}), all land.

The city of Clements is located in Three Lakes Township.

== Demographics ==
As of the census of 2000, there were 185 people, 72 households, and 56 families residing in the township. The population density was 5.2 people per square mile (2.0/km^{2}). There were 79 housing units at an average density of 2.2/sq mi (0.9/km^{2}). The racial makeup of the township was 100.00% White.

There were 72 households, out of which 29.2% had children under the age of 18 living with them, 66.7% were married couples living together, 6.9% had a female householder with no husband present, and 22.2% were non-families. 16.7% of all households were made up of individuals, and 9.7% had someone living alone who was 65 years of age or older. The average household size was 2.57 and the average family size was 2.88.

In the township the population was spread out, with 20.5% under the age of 18, 9.7% from 18 to 24, 26.5% from 25 to 44, 25.4% from 45 to 64, and 17.8% who were 65 years of age or older. The median age was 42 years. For every 100 females, there were 98.9 males. For every 100 females age 18 and over, there were 101.4 males.

The median income for a household in the township was $34,219, and the median income for a family was $34,531. Males had a median income of $25,000 versus $17,500 for females. The per capita income for the township was $14,896. About 2.2% of families and 6.0% of the population were below the poverty line, including 13.6% of those under the age of eighteen and none of those 65 or over.
