= Redwood County Poor Farm =

Coordinates: 44°32′39.5″N 95°8′3″W

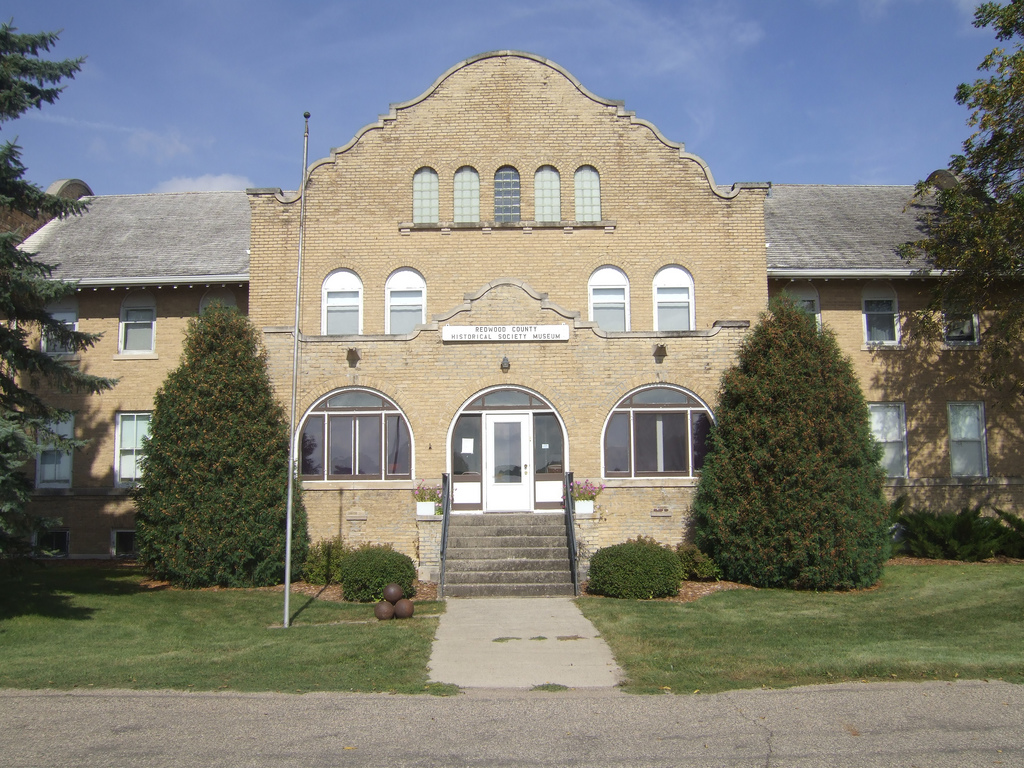
- Location: Redwood Falls, Minnesota, United States

The Redwood County Poor Farm (or Poorhouse) was a county run institution serving impoverished and aged people in Redwood Falls, Minnesota, United States, from 1884 to 1889 and again from 1909 to 1967, when it was converted to a nursing home.

Today the building houses the Redwood County Museum, which is operated by the Redwood County Historical Society. There are 30 rooms of local history and cultural exhibits, including such period rooms as a living room, dining room, kitchen, general store, military room, and doctor's office. There are also three natural history rooms with local wildlife, Native American artifacts, musical instruments, toys and period clothing. A one-room school building is on the grounds. The museum is open on weekends from May through October.

== Institutional history ==
=== Location ===
The Redwood County Poor Farm was constructed at its current location in 1907; prior to this there had been another poor farm. In 1884, a site was purchased in the Sherman Township for three thousand dollars. This poor farm was on one hundred and sixty acres, had a nine-room house and was located approximately thirteen miles from the county seat of Redwood Falls. According to the Redwood County Commissioner Meeting minutes (January 3, 1889), the vast majority of the costs from the facility came from providing medical care, followed by food costs. At that same meeting, it was decided that the farm would be sold for three thousand two hundred dollars with a sale/move out date of February 5, 1889. The reason given for the sale was the “premises is not properly located, convenient or adapted for the purpose of a ‘County Poor Farm.’” It “is for the best interest of said County to sell said premises and purchase premesis [sic] more convenient and better adapted for “Poor Farm” purposes.”

At the Commissioner Meeting on April 18th 1899, the board was approached with a proposition signed by twenty-nine citizens of Morgan (approximately fourteen miles from Redwood Falls). The proposition stated that the village was willing to provide either “$1,000 for creation and construction of a building within one mile of town” or a “deed for forty acres.” The board passed a motion to accept the deed. Commissioners had a change of mind, however, apparently based on the inconvenience of overseeing a farm at a distance from the courthouse. The Morgan group protested the action, and on January 2, 1900, the case went to court. District Judge B.F. Weber at New Ulm ruled for the county April 20.

According to the Redwood County Historical Society (2008), the board had taken possession of the land on May 1, 1899, and planted grain instead of building a poor farm. It can be observed by reading the Redwood County Commissioner's financial expenses in the meeting minutes that during the time without a poor farm, those in need were either provided for in their own homes or in the homes of others in the community. For example, the following lines appear in the July 8, 1907, proceedings.

The following bills were paid in full:

William Hemminger, Three months care and board of Peter Hemminger: $30.00

A.L.A. Graves, House rent for E.J. Bunce for July: $10.00

W.T. Wilcox, Wood for Green and Birum: $3.50

However, it was at this meeting in 1907 that the board passed a resolution by unanimous vote to purchase land to build a new home for the county poor. On July 24, 1907, Redwood County purchased twenty five and three quarters acres for three thousand dollars. It wasn't until a Special Session convening on June 2, 1908, that the County Board accepted a bid of sixteen thousand four hundred fifty dollars for the construction of a county home. Here, records conflict; the Spanish-style home was open for “inmates” either in November 1908 or September 1909. Ole Bollum became the first superintendent of the site in 1912 when he moved into the home with his wife and two children. “It was general practice to keep horses, cows, and chickens, and carry on General Farming” including having a large garden. The home itself could house approximately ten to fifteen “inmates”.

=== Admissions ===
As with many institutions, there was most likely an admission process; however, this documentation as noted above is not currently available. However, it is possible to know something about the admission processes for poorhouses from exploring the current attitudes of the era.

The first step in the admission process was likely to be determining the eligibility of applicants as it was believed that “persons and families every way competent to provide for afflicted members of their household seek to place them under public care, as a mere riddance from disagreeable duty or personal responsibility”. The next step in the admission process would be to register an individual, recording “name, age, sex, condition, nativity, ancestry, education, civil relations, personal habits, causes, either immediate or remote, of present condition of dependence, and of anything, everything, in the history of the individual, calculated to direct as well as justify the public care”. The third step in the admission process would be to classify the inmates to improve “personal treatment as well as …the common comfort of the household. Lastly, would be to instruct the individuals any rules of the home.

Also identified were three things that required special attention in poorhouses: cleanliness, good order, and employment. This was due to “three things in which an average pauper delights, - dirt, disorder, and idleness”.

=== Work requirements ===
According to the museum curator, those living at the Redwood County poor farm were required to work. The men were apparently able to find work with local farmers, and the women doing work on the poor farm itself and/or doing various jobs for other community members. The curator stated that the employment with local farmers usually became permanent employment, and that the farmer's chicken coop would then be converted into a home for the family to move into.

=== Depression years ===
Contrary to popular belief that the Redwood County poor farm always existed on the current acreage (55 acres), twenty five and a quarter acres were added to the property for four thousand four hundred eighty five dollars on March 8, 1932. However, the biggest change came in 1935. During the beginning of the Great Depression “reliefer” families were placed in a nearby mansion, which caught fire that year. The lumber from the mansion was salvaged and constructed into six cottages on the property for the families. These new buildings were small “shacks” without electricity and share a single well and pump. Accusations came in 1937 that the families living in the colony cottages were not impoverished and were ordered by the county commissioners to vacate the buildings by July 1 that year. The families appealed to a state relief administrator, who intervened and asked the commissioners to continue to allow the families to live at the colony as long as they paid eight dollars a month rent. The county relief officials agreed with this, but expressed a desire for the families to leave as soon as the found available homes. The few years the county poor farm spent as the county colony ended when the colony cottages were put on the auction block. An interesting fact is that one of the cottages on the property continues to be rented out.

=== Later years ===
In the fall of 1939, discussions began advocating that the home be turned into a school for girls, administrated by the Nation Youth Administration. The board approved this motion, four to one, on December 14, 1939, setting the date for the school to be open as January 15, 1940. There were currently fifteen “patients” in the county home. The lone dissenter, J.P. Kragh, with support from a lawyer, W.R. Werring and a local wealthy farmer, C.O. Gilfillan, was able to have the decision reversed two weeks later. In March 1940, the commissioners turned the county poor farm records over to Gilfillan, who offered to conduct a study “to get the most out of the property” at his own expense. His goal was that “some plan could be worked out to relieve the taxpayers of this burden to some extent and at the same time afford adequate care for the aged and unfortunates who are now county charges”. On July 2, 1940, Gilfillan offered to pay Redwood County eighteen hundred dollars yearly for “the care and maintenance…of bedridden inmates, old men and women and other worthy needy who are inmates”. Some remodeling was done to move the county poor farm away from its function as a poor farm toward its future as a Homes for the aged, and its capacity increased to approximately thirty six people. During the time period until 1967 it was known at the Redwood County Home. At this time an elevator was added and more beds to increase the capacity to forty eight and with the new licensing requirements it became the Redwood County Nursing Home.

== Sources ==
- Barnes, G. (1932). Deed Record 82. Redwood County.
- Bolton & Menk, Inc. (August 16, 1995). Parcel Inquiry. Redwood County.
- Byers, A.G. (1886). The administration of poorhouses and jails. The official proceedings of the annual meeting: 1886. (pp. 31–36). National Conference on Social Welfare.
- Curtiss-Wedge, F. (1916). The history of Redwood County Minnesota. Chicago: H.C. Cooper Jr. & Co.
- Day, P. (2009). A new history of social welfare(6th ed.). Boston: Pearson.
- Evacuation of colony waits: County getting rent until new homes are found. (1937, July 22). The Redwood Gazette. p. 4.
- Jarchow, M. (1986). Like father, like son: The Gilfillan story. St. Paul: Ramsey County Historical Society
- Parker, F. (1907). Deed Record 54. Redwood County.
- Redwood County Commissioners. (January 3, 1889). Commissioners proceedings (official). Redwood County Records.
- Redwood County Commissioners. (April 18, 1899). Commissioners proceedings (official). Redwood County Records.
- Redwood County Commissioners. (July 8, 1907). Commissioners proceedings (official). Redwood County Records.
- Redwood County Commissioners. (June 2, 1908). Special session commissioners proceedings (official). Redwood County Records.
- Redwood County Commissioners. (July 11, 1908). Commissioners proceedings (official). Redwood County Records.
- Redwood County Commissioners. (1934). Commissioners proceedings (official). Redwood County Records.
- Redwood County Commissioners. (December 14, 1939). Commissioners proceedings (official). Redwood County Records.
- Redwood County Commissioners. (July 2, 1940). Commissioners proceedings (official). Redwood County Records.
- Redwood County Historical Society. (2008). Redwood County Poor Farm. Redwood Falls, Mn: Author.
- Webb, W. & Swedberg, J. (1964). Redwood: The story of a county. St. Paul: North Central Publishing Co.
- Wright, A.O. (1889). Employment in poorhouses. The official proceedings of the annual meeting: 1889. (pp. 197–203). National Conference on Social Welfare.
- Wyman, H. (1889). The Michigan poor in almshouses. The official proceedings of the annual meeting: 1889. (pp. 203–209). National Conference on Social Welfare.
