= Vail Township, Redwood County, Minnesota =

Vail Township, Minnesota
- Township
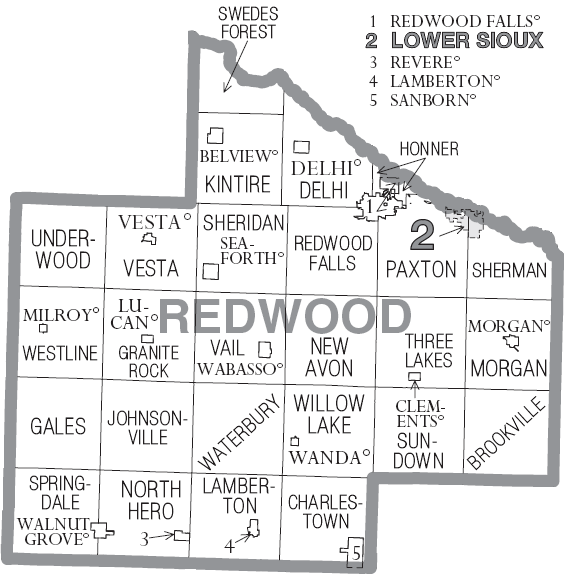
- Cities and townships of Redwood County
- Coordinates: 44°24′23″N 95°18′0″W
- Country: United States
- State: Minnesota
- County: Redwood

Area
  - Total: 35.2 sq mi (91.2 km^{2})
  - Land: 35.1 sq mi (90.8 km^{2})
  - Water: 0.15 sq mi (0.4 km^{2})
- Elevation: 1,073 ft (327 m)

Population (2000)
  - Total: 310
  - Density: 8.8/sq mi (3.4/km^{2})
- Time zone: UTC-6 (Central (CST))
  - Summer (DST): UTC-5 (CDT)
- FIPS code: 27-66478
- GNIS feature ID: 0665848

Vail Township is one of the twenty-six townships of Redwood County, Minnesota, United States. The population was 310 at the 2000 census.

Vail Township was organized in 1879, and named for Fred Vail Hotchkiss, a county official.

== Geography ==
According to the United States Census Bureau, the township has a total area of 35.2 square miles (91.2 km^{2}), of which 35.0 square miles (90.8 km^{2}) is land and 0.2 square mile (0.4 km^{2}) (0.45%) is water.

The city of Wabasso is located in Vail Township.

== Demographics ==
As of the census of 2000, there were 310 people, 84 households, and 72 families residing in the township. The population density was 8.8 people per square mile (3.4/km^{2}). There were 89 housing units at an average density of 2.5/sq mi (1.0/km^{2}). The racial makeup of the township was 99.68% White, and 0.32% from two or more races.

There were 84 households, out of which 48.8% had children under the age of 18 living with them, 82.1% were married couples living together, 2.4% had a female householder with no husband present, and 13.1% were non-families. 13.1% of all households were made up of individuals, and 2.4% had someone living alone who was 65 years of age or older. The average household size was 3.23 and the average family size was 3.51.

In the township, 33.5% of the population was under the age of 18, 4.8% were from 18 to 24, 19.0% from 25 to 44, 22.3% from 45 to 64, and 20.3% were 65 years of age or older. The median age was 39 years. For every 100 females, there were 113.8 males. For every 100 females age 18 and over, there were 98.1 males.

The median income for a household in the township was $37,500, and the median income for a family was $38,036. Males had a median income of $24,375 versus $20,500 for females. The per capita income for the township was $12,633. None of the families and 0.8% of the population were living below the poverty line, including no under eighteens and none of those over 64.
