= Waterbury Township, Redwood County, Minnesota =

Waterbury Township, Minnesota
- Township
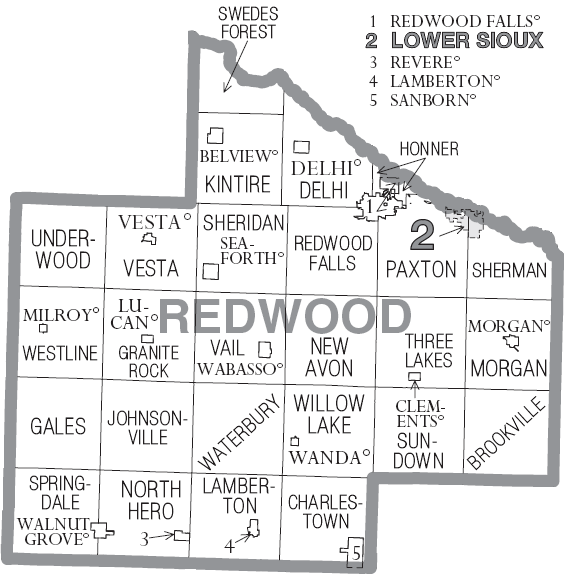
- Cities and townships of Redwood County
- Coordinates: 44°19′58″N 95°17′47″W
- Country: United States
- State: Minnesota
- County: Redwood

Area
  - Total: 36.3 sq mi (93.9 km^{2})
  - Land: 36.2 sq mi (93.7 km^{2})
  - Water: 0.039 sq mi (0.1 km^{2})
- Elevation: 1,079 ft (329 m)

Population (2000)
  - Total: 221
  - Density: 6.2/sq mi (2.4/km^{2})
- Time zone: UTC-6 (Central (CST))
  - Summer (DST): UTC-5 (CDT)
- FIPS code: 27-68494
- GNIS feature ID: 0665928

Waterbury Township is one of the twenty-six townships of Redwood County, Minnesota, United States. The population was 221 at the 2000 census.

Waterbury Township was organized in 1878 and named after Waterbury, Vermont.

== Geography ==
According to the United States Census Bureau, the township has a total area of 36.2 square miles (93.9 km^{2}), of which 36.2 square miles (93.7 km^{2}) is land and 0.1 square mile (0.1 km^{2}) (0.14%) is water.

No municipalities are located in Waterbury Township.

== Demographics ==
As of the census of 2000, there were 221 people, 83 households, and 67 families residing in the township. The population density was 6.1 people per square mile (2.4/km^{2}). There were 94 housing units at an average density of 2.6/sq mi (1.0/km^{2}). The racial makeup of the township was 96.38% White, 0.90% Asian, and 2.71% from other races. Hispanic or Latino of any race were 4.07% of the population.

There were 83 households, out of which 31.3% had children under the age of 18 living with them, 69.9% were married couples living together, 4.8% had a female householder with no husband present, and 18.1% were non-families. 18.1% of all households were made up of individuals, and 6.0% had someone living alone who was 65 years of age or older. The average household size was 2.66 and the average family size was 2.91.

In the township, the population was spread out, with 24.0% under the age of 18, 6.3% from 18 to 24, 27.6% from 25 to 44, 32.6% from 45 to 64, and 9.5% who were 65 years of age or older. The median age was 40 years. For every 100 females, there were 121.0 males. For every 100 females aged 18 and over, there were 112.7 males.

The median income for a household in the township was $32,188, and the median income for a family was $37,813. Males had a median income of $25,500 versus $15,313 for females. The per capita income for the township was $15,919. About 14.5% of families and 10.5% of the population were below the poverty line, including none of those under the age of eighteen and 21.4% of those 65 or over.
