= Lamberton, Minnesota =

City in Minnesota, United States

Lamberton
- City
- Cities and townships of Redwood County
- Coordinates: 44°13′45″N 95°16′2″W
- Country: United States
- State: Minnesota
- County: Redwood

Area
  - Total: 0.76 sq mi (1.98 km^{2})
  - Land: 0.76 sq mi (1.98 km^{2})
  - Water: 0 sq mi (0.00 km^{2})
- Elevation: 1,142 ft (348 m)

Population (2020)
  - Total: 792
  - Density: 1,036.3/sq mi (400.13/km^{2})
- Time zone: UTC-6 (Central (CST))
  - Summer (DST): UTC-5 (CDT)
- ZIP code: 56152
- Area code: 507
- FIPS code: 27-35288
- GNIS feature ID: 0646457
- Website: https://lambertonmn.com/

Lamberton is a town in Redwood County, Minnesota, United States. As of the 2020 census, Lamberton had a population of 792.

== History ==
Lamberton was platted in 1873, and named for Henry Wilson Lamberton, a railroad official. A post office has been in operation at Lamberton since 1873. Lamberton was incorporated in 1879.

== Geography ==
According to the United States Census Bureau, the city has a total area of 0.78 square miles (2.02 km^{2}), all land.

Lamberton is located along U.S. Highway 14, an east–west highway that connects it to Springfield to the east and Revere to the west.

== Climate ==
According to the Köppen Climate Classification system, Lamberton has a hot-summer humid continental climate, abbreviated "Dfa" on climate maps. The hottest temperature recorded in Lamberton was 106 °F (41.1 °C) on June 15, 1979 and August 1, 1988, while the coldest temperature recorded was −34 °F (−36.7 °C) on January 19, 1970 and January 21–22, 1970.

Climate data for Lamberton, Minnesota (Southwest Research and Outreach Center), 1991–2020 normals, extremes 1961–present
Month	Jan	Feb	Mar	Apr	May	Jun	Jul	Aug	Sep	Oct	Nov	Dec	Year
Record high °F (°C)	66 (19)	68 (20)	85 (29)	95 (35)	100 (38)	106 (41)	105 (41)	106 (41)	102 (39)	95 (35)	81 (27)	68 (20)	106 (41)
Mean maximum °F (°C)	44.6 (7.0)	50.3 (10.2)	66.3 (19.1)	80.8 (27.1)	90.4 (32.4)	94.4 (34.7)	93.2 (34.0)	91.9 (33.3)	89.2 (31.8)	83.5 (28.6)	66.1 (18.9)	48.9 (9.4)	96.6 (35.9)
Mean daily maximum °F (°C)	22.6 (−5.2)	27.2 (−2.7)	39.4 (4.1)	55.0 (12.8)	68.4 (20.2)	78.7 (25.9)	82.2 (27.9)	79.6 (26.4)	73.4 (23.0)	59.0 (15.0)	41.9 (5.5)	27.9 (−2.3)	54.6 (12.5)
Daily mean °F (°C)	13.8 (−10.1)	18.0 (−7.8)	30.3 (−0.9)	44.0 (6.7)	57.4 (14.1)	68.3 (20.2)	71.6 (22.0)	68.8 (20.4)	61.3 (16.3)	47.4 (8.6)	32.5 (0.3)	19.6 (−6.9)	44.4 (6.9)
Mean daily minimum °F (°C)	5.0 (−15.0)	8.8 (−12.9)	21.2 (−6.0)	33.0 (0.6)	46.5 (8.1)	57.9 (14.4)	61.0 (16.1)	58.0 (14.4)	49.1 (9.5)	35.8 (2.1)	23.0 (−5.0)	11.3 (−11.5)	34.2 (1.2)
Mean minimum °F (°C)	−17.3 (−27.4)	−12.0 (−24.4)	−2.8 (−19.3)	18.1 (−7.7)	31.5 (−0.3)	44.7 (7.1)	49.0 (9.4)	45.9 (7.7)	33.0 (0.6)	18.9 (−7.3)	3.6 (−15.8)	−11.6 (−24.2)	−20.5 (−29.2)
Record low °F (°C)	−34 (−37)	−30 (−34)	−23 (−31)	3 (−16)	18 (−8)	35 (2)	39 (4)	35 (2)	20 (−7)	2 (−17)	−19 (−28)	−31 (−35)	−34 (−37)
Average precipitation inches (mm)	0.54 (14)	0.66 (17)	1.50 (38)	2.92 (74)	3.97 (101)	4.59 (117)	3.79 (96)	3.55 (90)	3.46 (88)	2.26 (57)	1.27 (32)	0.82 (21)	29.33 (745)
Average snowfall inches (cm)	8.9 (23)	8.4 (21)	7.9 (20)	4.9 (12)	0.2 (0.51)	0.0 (0.0)	0.0 (0.0)	0.0 (0.0)	0.0 (0.0)	0.7 (1.8)	5.9 (15)	9.4 (24)	46.3 (117.31)
Average extreme snow depth inches (cm)	11.1 (28)	11.0 (28)	10.2 (26)	3.1 (7.9)	0.1 (0.25)	0.0 (0.0)	0.0 (0.0)	0.0 (0.0)	0.0 (0.0)	0.2 (0.51)	4.5 (11)	8.4 (21)	15.9 (40)
Average precipitation days (≥ 0.01 in)	6.1	6.2	7.3	10.0	12.9	12.9	10.3	10.1	9.1	8.4	6.0	6.6	105.9
Average snowy days (≥ 0.1 in)	5.0	5.0	3.3	1.3	0.1	0.0	0.0	0.0	0.0	0.4	2.4	4.7	22.2
Source 1: NOAA
Source 2: National Weather Service

== Demographics ==
Historical population
Census	Pop.	Note	%±
1880	149		—
1890	202		35.6%
1900	624		208.9%
1910	652		4.5%
1920	872		33.7%
1930	782		−10.3%
1940	922		17.9%
1950	1,208		31.0%
1960	1,141		−5.5%
1970	962		−15.7%
1980	1,032		7.3%
1990	972		−5.8%
2000	859		−11.6%
2010	824		−4.1%
2020	792		−3.9%
U.S. Decennial Census

=== 2010 census ===
As of the census of 2010, there were 824 people, 366 households, and 198 families living in the city. The population density was 1,056.4 inhabitants per square mile (407.9/km^{2}). There were 429 housing units at an average density of 550.0 per square mile (212.4/km^{2}). The racial makeup of the city was 96.7% White, 0.2% Native American, 1.6% Asian, 0.5% from other races, and 1.0% from two or more races. Hispanic or Latino of any race were 1.9% of the population.

There were 366 households, of which 20.8% had children under the age of 18 living with them, 44.0% were married couples living together, 7.9% had a female householder with no husband present, 2.2% had a male householder with no wife present, and 45.9% were non-families. 42.1% of all households were made up of individuals, and 23.5% had someone living alone who was 65 years of age or older. The average household size was 2.10 and the average family size was 2.90.

The median age in the city was 50.3 years. 21% of residents were under the age of 18; 4.6% were between the ages of 18 and 24; 19.3% were from 25 to 44; 22.1% were from 45 to 64; and 33% were 65 years of age or older. The gender makeup of the city was 46.1% male and 53.9% female.

=== 2000 census ===
As of the census of 2000, there were 859 people, 392 households, and 219 families living in the city. The population density was 1,371.6 inhabitants per square mile (529.6/km^{2}). There were 447 housing units at an average density of 713.7 per square mile (275.6/km^{2}). The racial makeup of the city was 99.65% White, 0.12% Native American, and 0.23% from two or more races. Hispanic or Latino of any race were 0.12% of the population.

There were 392 households, out of which 20.4% had children under the age of 18 living with them, 48.2% were married couples living together, 5.9% had a female householder with no husband present, and 43.9% were non-families. 41.3% of all households were made up of individuals, and 28.1% had someone living alone who was 65 years of age or older. The average household size was 2.04 and the average family size was 2.79.

In the city, the population was spread out, with 20.1% under the age of 18, 4.3% from 18 to 24, 20.3% from 25 to 44, 17.6% from 45 to 64, and 37.7% who were 65 years of age or older. The median age was 51 years. For every 100 females, there were 86.3 males. For every 100 females age 18 and over, there were 80.1 males.

The median income for a household in the city was $28,603, and the median income for a family was $38,646. Males had a median income of $30,865 versus $20,278 for females. The per capita income for the city was $16,721. About 12.2% of families and 14.0% of the population were below the poverty line, including 19.1% of those under age 18 and 17.0% of those age 65 or over.

== Notable people ==
- Timothy Johnson (fighter), mixed martial artist
- Bob Gebhard, Major League baseball player, MLB front office executive
