= Morgan, Minnesota =

City in Minnesota, United States

Morgan
- City
- Cities and townships of Redwood County
- Coordinates: 44°24′59″N 94°55′33″W
- Country: United States
- State: Minnesota
- County: Redwood
- Founded: 1878
- Incorporated: 1889

Area
  - Total: 0.55 sq mi (1.43 km^{2})
  - Land: 0.55 sq mi (1.43 km^{2})
  - Water: 0 sq mi (0.00 km^{2})
- Elevation: 1,043 ft (318 m)

Population (2020)
  - Total: 888
  - Estimate (2022): 882
  - Density: 1,609.9/sq mi (621.58/km^{2})
- Time zone: UTC-6 (Central (CST))
  - Summer (DST): UTC-5 (CDT)
- ZIP code: 56266
- Area code: 507
- FIPS code: 27-44116
- GNIS feature ID: 0648109
- Website: https://www.cityofmorganmn.com/

Morgan is a city in Redwood County, Minnesota, United States. The population was 888 at the 2020 census.

== History ==
Morgan was platted in 1878. The city was named for Lewis H. Morgan (1818-1881), an American politician and anthropologist. A post office has been in operation in Morgan since 1878. Morgan was incorporated in 1889.

== Geography ==
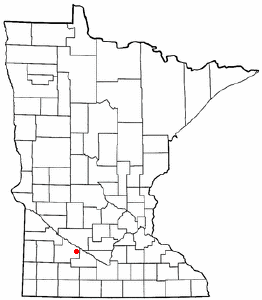
Location of Morgan, Minnesota

According to the United States Census Bureau, the city has a total area of 0.55 square miles (1.42 km^{2}), all land.

Morgan is located at the intersection of Minnesota Highway 67 and Minnesota Highway 68.

== Demographics ==
Historical population
| Census | Pop. | Note | %± |
|---|---|---|---|
| 1890 | 301 | | — |
| 1900 | 592 | | 96.7% |
| 1910 | 553 | | −6.6% |
| 1920 | 670 | | 21.2% |
| 1930 | 640 | | −4.5% |
| 1940 | 846 | | 32.2% |
| 1950 | 949 | | 12.2% |
| 1960 | 975 | | 2.7% |
| 1970 | 972 | | −0.3% |
| 1980 | 975 | | 0.3% |
| 1990 | 965 | | −1.0% |
| 2000 | 903 | | −6.4% |
| 2010 | 896 | | −0.8% |
| 2020 | 888 | | −0.9% |
| 2022 (est.) | 882 | | −0.7% |
U.S. Decennial Census; 2020 Census

=== 2010 census ===
As of the census of 2010, there were 896 people, 373 households, and 230 families living in the city. The population density was 1,629.1 inhabitants per square mile (629.0/km^{2}). There were 408 housing units at an average density of 741.8 per square mile (286.4/km^{2}). The racial makeup of the city was 94.8% White, 2.5% Native American, 0.2% Asian, and 2.6% from two or more races. Hispanic or Latino of any race were 2.8% of the population.

There were 373 households, of which 30.6% had children under the age of 18 living with them, 49.1% were married couples living together, 10.2% had a female householder with no husband present, 2.4% had a male householder with no wife present, and 38.3% were non-families. 34.6% of all households were made up of individuals, and 17.7% had someone living alone who was 65 years of age or older. The average household size was 2.31 and the average family size was 2.99.

The median age in the city was 38.2 years. 26.2% of residents were under the age of 18; 6.5% were between the ages of 18 and 24; 24% were from 25 to 44; 20.1% were from 45 to 64; and 23.2% were 65 years of age or older. The gender makeup of the city was 48.1% male and 51.9% female.

=== 2000 census ===
As of the census of 2000, there were 903 people, 377 households, and 243 families living in the city. The population density was 1,644.3 inhabitants per square mile (634.9/km^{2}). There were 423 housing units at an average density of 770.3 per square mile (297.4/km^{2}). The racial makeup of the city was 97.34% White, 0.33% Native American, 0.11% Asian, 0.55% from other races, and 1.66% from two or more races. Hispanic or Latino of any race were 1.88% of the population.

There were 377 households, out of which 27.3% had children under the age of 18 living with them, 56.2% were married couples living together, 6.9% had a female householder with no husband present, and 35.3% were non-families. 32.4% of all households were made up of individuals, and 20.2% had someone living alone who was 65 years of age or older. The average household size was 2.29 and the average family size was 2.90.

In the city, the population was spread out, with 24.4% under the age of 18, 6.3% from 18 to 24, 21.3% from 25 to 44, 17.9% from 45 to 64, and 30.1% who were 65 years of age or older. The median age was 43 years. For every 100 females, there were 83.9 males. For every 100 females age 18 and over, there were 81.2 males.

The median income for a household in the city was $30,673, and the median income for a family was $40,096. Males had a median income of $27,031 versus $21,250 for females. The per capita income for the city was $16,454. About 4.2% of families and 5.8% of the population were below the poverty line, including 5.9% of those under age 18 and 8.0% of those age 65 or over.
