= Sherman Township, Redwood County, Minnesota =

Sherman Township, Minnesota
- Township
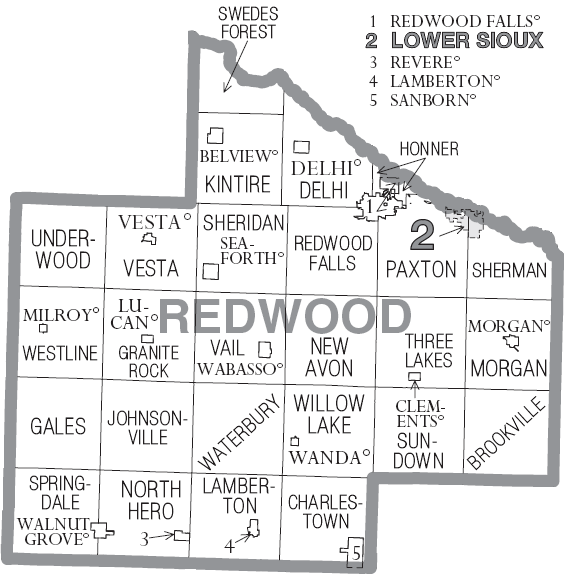
- Cities and townships of Redwood County
- Coordinates: 44°29′48″N 94°56′10″W
- Country: United States
- State: Minnesota
- County: Redwood

Area
  - Total: 27.5 sq mi (71.3 km^{2})
  - Land: 27.5 sq mi (71.3 km^{2})
  - Water: 0 sq mi (0.0 km^{2})
- Elevation: 1,020 ft (310 m)

Population (2000)
  - Total: 301
  - Density: 11/sq mi (4.2/km^{2})
- Time zone: UTC-6 (Central (CST))
  - Summer (DST): UTC-5 (CDT)
- FIPS code: 27-59692
- GNIS feature ID: 0665595

Sherman Township is one of the twenty-six townships of Redwood County, Minnesota, United States. The population was 301 at the 2000 census.

Sherman Township was organized in 1869, and named for William Tecumseh Sherman (1820–1891), a U.S. Civil War general.

== Geography ==
According to the United States Census Bureau, the township has a total area of 27.5 square miles (71.3 km^{2}), of which 27.5 square miles (71.3 km^{2}) is land and 0.04 square mile (0.1 km^{2}) (0.07%) is water.

Much of the Lower Sioux Indian Reservation is located in Sherman Township.

== Demographics ==
As of the census of 2000, there were 301 people, 107 households, and 81 families residing in the township. The population density was 10.9 people per square mile (4.2/km^{2}). There were 111 housing units at an average density of 4.0/sq mi (1.6/km^{2}). The racial makeup of the township was 54.82% White, 43.19% Native American, and 1.99% from two or more races.

There were 107 households, out of which 42.1% had children under the age of 18 living with them, 54.2% were married couples living together, 15.0% had a female householder with no husband present, and 23.4% were non-families. 19.6% of all households were made up of individuals, and 9.3% had someone living alone who was 65 years of age or older. The average household size was 2.81 and the average family size was 3.16.

In the township the population was spread out, with 32.2% under the age of 18, 10.0% from 18 to 24, 23.6% from 25 to 44, 23.6% from 45 to 64, and 10.6% who were 65 years of age or older. The median age was 31 years. For every 100 females, there were 121.3 males. For every 100 females age 18 and over, there were 114.7 males.

The median income for a household in the township was $60,625, and the median income for a family was $63,295. Males had a median income of $24,844 versus $21,250 for females. The per capita income for the township was $23,549. About 4.8% of families and 9.6% of the population were below the poverty line, including 9.0% of those under the age of eighteen and 8.6% of those 65 or over.
