= Wanda, Minnesota =

City in Minnesota, United States

Wanda
- City
- Cities and townships of Redwood County
- Coordinates: 44°18′54″N 95°12′47″W
- Country: United States
- State: Minnesota
- County: Redwood

Area
  - Total: 0.26 sq mi (0.68 km^{2})
  - Land: 0.26 sq mi (0.67 km^{2})
  - Water: 0.0039 sq mi (0.01 km^{2})
- Elevation: 1,086 ft (331 m)

Population (2020)
  - Total: 72
  - Density: 277.9/sq mi (107.28/km^{2})
- Time zone: UTC-6 (Central (CST))
  - Summer (DST): UTC-5 (CDT)
- ZIP code: 56294
- Area code: 507
- FIPS code: 27-68008
- GNIS feature ID: 2397190

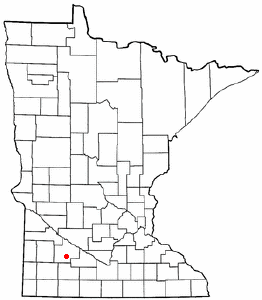
Location of Wanda, Minnesota

Wanda is a city in Redwood County, Minnesota, United States. As of the 2020 census, Wanda had a population of 72.

== History ==
Wanda was platted in 1899. The name is derived from the Ojibwe language, meaning "forgetfulness". A post office has been in operation at Wanda since 1900. Wanda was incorporated in 1901.

== Geography ==
According to the United States Census Bureau, the city has a total area of 0.26 square miles (0.67 km^{2}), all land.

Wanda is west of U.S. Highway 71 and north of U.S. Highway 14. County Highway 17 connects Wanda to County Highway 4, less than one mile to the north, which in turn connects it to U.S. Highway 71, approximately four miles to the east.

== Demographics ==
Historical population
Census	Pop.	Note	%±
1910	129		—
1920	185		43.4%
1930	151		−18.4%
1940	191		26.5%
1950	178		−6.8%
1960	160		−10.1%
1970	124		−22.5%
1980	118		−4.8%
1990	103		−12.7%
2000	103		0.0%
2010	84		−18.4%
2020	72		−14.3%
U.S. Decennial Census

=== 2010 census ===
As of the census of 2010, there were 84 people, 39 households, and 25 families living in the city. The population density was 323.1 inhabitants per square mile (124.7/km^{2}). There were 41 housing units at an average density of 157.7 per square mile (60.9/km^{2}). The racial makeup of the city was 100.0% White.

There were 39 households, of which 20.5% had children under the age of 18 living with them, 51.3% were married couples living together, 5.1% had a female householder with no husband present, 7.7% had a male householder with no wife present, and 35.9% were non-families. 35.9% of all households were made up of individuals, and 12.9% had someone living alone who was 65 years of age or older. The average household size was 2.15 and the average family size was 2.76.

The median age in the city was 50.5 years. 22.6% of residents were under the age of 18; 3.7% were between the ages of 18 and 24; 17.8% were from 25 to 44; 39.3% were from 45 to 64; and 16.7% were 65 years of age or older. The gender makeup of the city was 48.8% male and 51.2% female.

=== 2000 census ===
At the 2000 census, there were 103 people, 45 households and 27 families living in the city. The population density was 410.6 inhabitants per square mile (158.5/km^{2}). There were 47 housing units at an average density of 187.4 per square mile (72.4/km^{2}). The racial makeup of the city was 100.00% White.

There were 45 households, of which 24.4% had children under the age of 18 living with them, 48.9% were married couples living together, 11.1% had a female householder with no husband present, and 37.8% were non-families. 37.8% of all households were made up of individuals, and 20.0% had someone living alone who was 65 years of age or older. The average household size was 2.29 and the average family size was 3.04.

Age distribution was 23.3% under the age of 18, 7.8% from 18 to 24, 19.4% from 25 to 44, 26.2% from 45 to 64, and 23.3% who were 65 years of age or older. The median age was 44 years. For every 100 females, there were 114.6 males. For every 100 females age 18 and over, there were 102.6 males.

The median household income was $36,250, and the median family income was $41,250. Males had a median income of $29,444 versus $11,667 for females. The per capita income for the city was $16,213. There were no families and 3.6% of the population living below the poverty line, including no under eighteens and 8.0% of those over 64.
