= Paxton Township, Redwood County, Minnesota =

Paxton Township, Minnesota
- Township
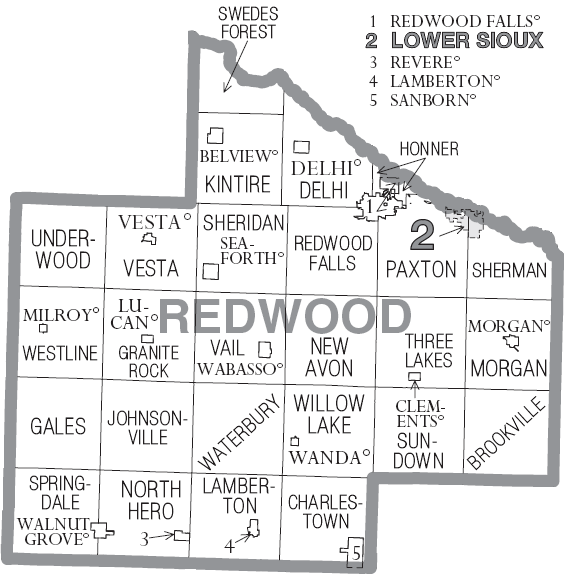
- Cities and townships of Redwood County
- Coordinates: 44°30′27″N 95°2′16″W
- Country: United States
- State: Minnesota
- County: Redwood

Area
  - Total: 37.0 sq mi (95.8 km^{2})
  - Land: 36.9 sq mi (95.7 km^{2})
  - Water: 0 sq mi (0.0 km^{2})
- Elevation: 1,030 ft (314 m)

Population (2000)
  - Total: 577
  - Density: 16/sq mi (6/km^{2})
- Time zone: UTC-6 (Central (CST))
  - Summer (DST): UTC-5 (CDT)
- FIPS code: 27-49894
- GNIS feature ID: 0665263

Paxton Township is one of the twenty-six townships of Redwood County, Minnesota, United States. The population was 577 at the 2000 census.

Paxton Township was organized in 1879, and named for James Wilson Paxton, a local landowner.

== Geography ==
According to the United States Census Bureau, the township has a total area of 37.0 square miles (95.8 km^{2}), of which 37.0 square miles (95.7 km^{2}) is land and 0.04 square mile (0.1 km^{2}) (0.05%) is water.

Part of the city of Redwood Falls, the county seat of Redwood County, is located in Paxton Township, as is a portion of the Lower Sioux Indian Reservation.

== Demographics ==
As of the census of 2000, there were 577 people, 206 households, and 152 families residing in the township. The population density was 15.6 people per square mile (6.0/km^{2}). There were 219 housing units at an average density of 5.9/sq mi (2.3/km^{2}). The racial makeup of the township was 64.82% White, 0.35% African American, 30.68% Native American, 0.17% Asian, 0.52% from other races, and 3.47% from two or more races. Hispanic or Latino of any race were 1.91% of the population.

There were 206 households, out of which 38.8% had children under the age of 18 living with them, 54.4% were married couples living together, 16.0% had a female householder with no husband present, and 26.2% were non-families. 21.4% of all households were made up of individuals, and 6.8% had someone living alone who was 65 years of age or older. The average household size was 2.76 and the average family size was 3.24.

In the township the population was spread out, with 30.8% under the age of 18, 9.2% from 18 to 24, 25.5% from 25 to 44, 23.4% from 45 to 64, and 11.1% who were 65 years of age or older. The median age was 36 years. For every 100 females, there were 112.9 males. For every 100 females age 18 and over, there were 110.0 males.

The median income for a household in the township was $57,813, and the median income for a family was $60,000. Males had a median income of $40,500 versus $19,750 for females. The per capita income for the township was $22,287. About 6.6% of families and 7.1% of the population were below the poverty line, including 9.0% of those under age 18 and 10.0% of those age 65 or over.
