= Delhi Township, Redwood County, Minnesota =

Delhi Township, Minnesota
- Township
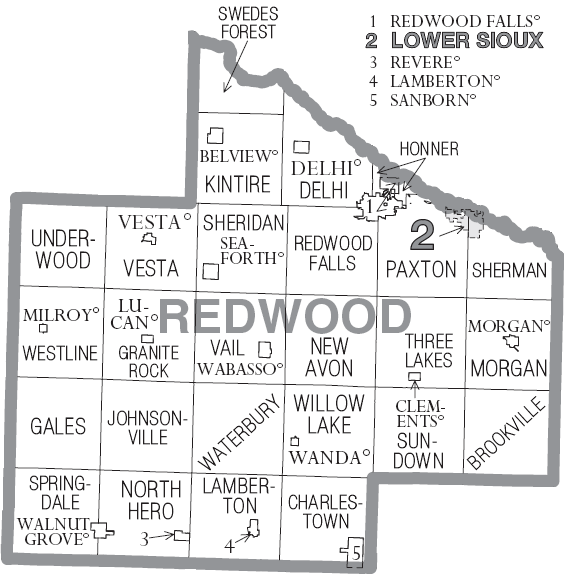
- Cities and townships of Redwood County
- Coordinates: 44°35′14″N 95°11′46″W
- Country: United States
- State: Minnesota
- County: Redwood

Area
  - Total: 33.2 sq mi (86.0 km^{2})
  - Land: 33.1 sq mi (85.7 km^{2})
  - Water: 0.077 sq mi (0.2 km^{2})
- Elevation: 1,030 ft (314 m)

Population (2000)
  - Total: 298
  - Density: 9.1/sq mi (3.5/km^{2})
- Time zone: UTC-6 (Central (CST))
  - Summer (DST): UTC-5 (CDT)
- ZIP code: 56283
- Area code: 507
- FIPS code: 27-15562
- GNIS feature ID: 0663960

Delhi Township is one of the twenty-six townships of Redwood County, Minnesota, United States. The population was 298 at the 2000 census.

Delhi Township was organized in 1876, and named after Delhi Township, Ohio in the Cincinnati metropolitan area.

== Geography ==
According to the United States Census Bureau, the township has a total area of 33.2 square miles (86 km^{2}), of which 33.1 square miles (86 km^{2}) is land and 0.1 square miles (0.26 km^{2}) (0.24%) is water.

The city of Delhi is located in Delhi Township, plus a corner of the county seat of Redwood Falls.

== Demographics ==
As of the census of 2000, there were 298 people, 109 households, and 84 families residing in the township. The population density was 9.0 inhabitants per square mile (3.5/km^{2}). There were 114 housing units at an average density of 3.4 per square mile (1.3/km^{2}). The racial makeup of the township was 97.32% White, 2.01% Native American, 0.34% from other races, and 0.34% from two or more races. Hispanic or Latino of any race were 0.34% of the population.

There were 109 households, out of which 34.9% had children under the age of 18 living with them, 69.7% were married couples living together, 3.7% had a female householder with no husband present, and 22.9% were non-families. 20.2% of all households were made up of individuals, and 10.1% had someone living alone who was 65 years of age or older. The average household size was 2.73 and the average family size was 3.17.

In the township, the population was spread out, with 28.2% under the age of 18, 6.4% from 18 to 24, 25.8% from 25 to 44, 26.5% from 45 to 64, and 13.1% who were 65 years of age or older. The median age was 39 years. For every 100 females, there were 120.7 males. For every 100 females age 18 and over, there were 111.9 males.

The median income for a household in the township was $55,833, and the median income for a family was $60,139. Males had a median income of $43,750 versus $20,625 for females. The per capita income for the township was $18,748. About 5.6% of families and 5.4% of the population were below the poverty line, including 5.6% of those under the age of eighteen and none of those 65 or over.
