= Brookville Township, Redwood County, Minnesota =

Brookville Township, Minnesota
- Township
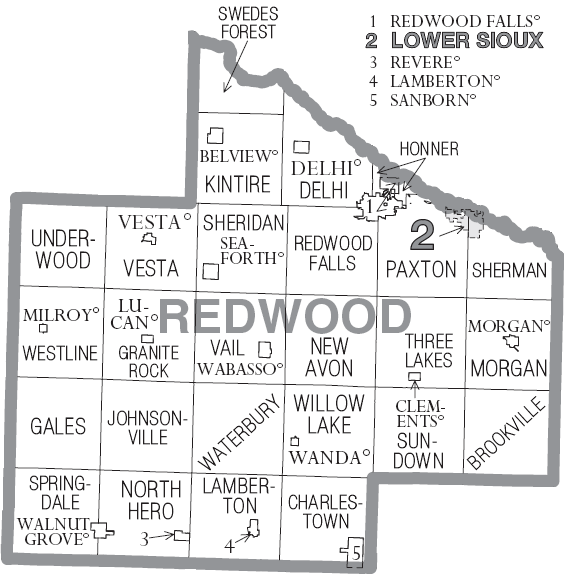
- Cities and townships of Redwood County
- Coordinates: 44°19′42″N 94°55′38″W
- Country: United States
- State: Minnesota
- County: Redwood

Area
  - Total: 35.8 sq mi (92.8 km^{2})
  - Land: 35.8 sq mi (92.8 km^{2})
  - Water: 0 sq mi (0.0 km^{2})
- Elevation: 1,040 ft (317 m)

Population (2000)
  - Total: 258
  - Density: 7.3/sq mi (2.8/km^{2})
- Time zone: UTC-6 (Central (CST))
  - Summer (DST): UTC-5 (CDT)
- FIPS code: 27-08074
- GNIS feature ID: 0663678

Brookville Township is one of the twenty-six townships of Redwood County, Minnesota, United States. The population was 258 at the 2000 census.

== History ==
Brookville Township was incorporated in 1873.

== Geography ==
According to the United States Census Bureau, the township has a total area of 35.8 square miles (93 km^{2}), all land.

No municipalities are located in Brookville Township.

== Demographics ==
As of the census of 2000, there were 258 people, 94 households, and 75 families residing in the township. The population density was 7.2 inhabitants per square mile (2.8/km^{2}). There were 100 housing units at an average density of 2.8 per square mile (1.1/km^{2}). The racial makeup of the township was 98.84% White, 0.39% Asian, and 0.78% from two or more races. Hispanic or Latino of any race were 2.71% of the population.

There were 94 households, out of which 35.1% had children under the age of 18 living with them, 74.5% were married couples living together, 1.1% had a female householder with no husband present, and 20.2% were non-families. 16.0% of all households were made up of individuals, and 3.2% had someone living alone who was 65 years of age or older. The average household size was 2.74 and the average family size was 3.11.

In the township the population was spread out, with 29.8% under the age of 18, 4.3% from 18 to 24, 22.1% from 25 to 44, 30.2% from 45 to 64, and 13.6% who were 65 years of age or older. The median age was 42 years. For every 100 females, there were 106.4 males. For every 100 females age 18 and over, there were 110.5 males.

The median income for a household in the township was $33,875, and the median income for a family was $35,833. Males had a median income of $25,417 versus $21,250 for females. The per capita income for the township was $14,802. About 4.9% of families and 6.5% of the population were below the poverty line, including none of those under the age of eighteen or sixty five or over.
