= Revere, Minnesota =

City in Minnesota, United States

- City
- Cities and townships of Redwood County
- Coordinates: 44°13′18″N 95°21′40″W
- Country: United States
- State: Minnesota
- County: Redwood
- Platted: May 1886
- Incorporated: February 21, 1900

Government
  - Mayor: Dean W. Baker

Area
  - Total: 0.573 sq mi (1.483 km^{2})
  - Land: 0.573 sq mi (1.483 km^{2})
  - Water: 0 sq mi (0.000 km^{2})
- Elevation: 1,145 ft (349 m)

Population (2020)
  - Total: 89
  - Estimate (2022): 88
  - Density: 155.4/sq mi (60.01/km^{2})
- Time zone: UTC−6 (Central (CST))
  - Summer (DST): UTC−5 (CDT)
- ZIP Code: 56166
- Area code: 507
- FIPS code: 27-53908
- GNIS feature ID: 2396355
- Sales tax: 7.375%

Revere is a city in Redwood County, Minnesota, United States. The population was 89 at the 2020 census.

== History ==
Revere was platted in 1886. It was named after Paul Revere, a patriot in the American Revolution. Revere was organized in 1900.

== Geography ==
According to the United States Census Bureau, the city has a total area of 0.573 square miles (1.48 km^{2}), all land.

Revere is located along U.S. Highway 14 between Walnut Grove to the west and Lamberton to the east.

== Demographics ==
Historical population
Census	Pop.	Note	%±
1910	134		—
1920	134		0.0%
1930	146		9.0%
1940	197		34.9%
1950	198		0.5%
1960	201		1.5%
1970	166		−17.4%
1980	158		−4.8%
1990	117		−25.9%
2000	100		−14.5%
2010	95		−5.0%
2020	89		−6.3%
2022 (est.)	88		−1.1%
U.S. Decennial Census; 2020 Census

=== 2010 census ===
As of the 2010 census, there were 95 people, 34 households, and 23 families living in the city. The population density was 166.7 inhabitants per square mile (64.4/km^{2}). There were 40 housing units at an average density of 70.2 per square mile (27.1/km^{2}). The racial makeup of the city was 91.6% White, 4.2% African American, 3.2% Native American, and 1.1% Asian. Hispanic or Latino of any race were 3.2% of the population.

There were 34 households, of which 26.5% had children under the age of 18 living with them, 50.0% were married couples living together, 5.9% had a female householder with no husband present, 11.8% had a male householder with no wife present, and 32.4% were non-families. 29.4% of all households were made up of individuals, and 8.8% had someone living alone who was 65 years of age or older. The average household size was 2.24 and the average family size was 2.78.

The median age in the city was 41.3 years. 20% of residents were under the age of 18; 11.6% were between the ages of 18 and 24; 25.3% were from 25 to 44; 30.6% were from 45 to 64; and 12.6% were 65 years of age or older. The gender makeup of the city was 53.7% male and 46.3% female.

=== 2000 census ===
As of the 2000 census, there were 100 people, 41 households, and 23 families living in the city. The population density was 174.0 inhabitants per square mile (67.2/km^{2}). There were 44 housing units at an average density of 76.6 per square mile (29.6/km^{2}). The racial makeup of the city was 98.00% White, 1.00% African American and 1.00% Native American.

There were 41 households, out of which 29.3% had children under the age of 18 living with them, 39.0% were married couples living together, 9.8% had a female householder with no husband present, and 43.9% were non-families. 41.5% of all households were made up of individuals, and 22.0% had someone living alone who was 65 years of age or older. The average household size was 2.00 and the average family size was 2.61.

In the city, the population was spread out, with 19.0% under the age of 18, 4.0% from 18 to 24, 34.0% from 25 to 44, 23.0% from 45 to 64, and 20.0% who were 65 years of age or older. The median age was 42 years. For every 100 females, there were 92.3 males. For every 100 females age 18 and over, there were 102.5 males.

The median income for a household in the city was $14,643, and the median income for a family was $21,875. Males had a median income of $31,250 versus $16,875 for females. The per capita income for the city was $14,519. There were 33.3% of families and 34.7% of the population living below the poverty line, including 42.1% of under eighteens and 14.8% of those over 64.
