= Johnsonville Township, Redwood County, Minnesota =

Johnsonville Township, Minnesota
- Township
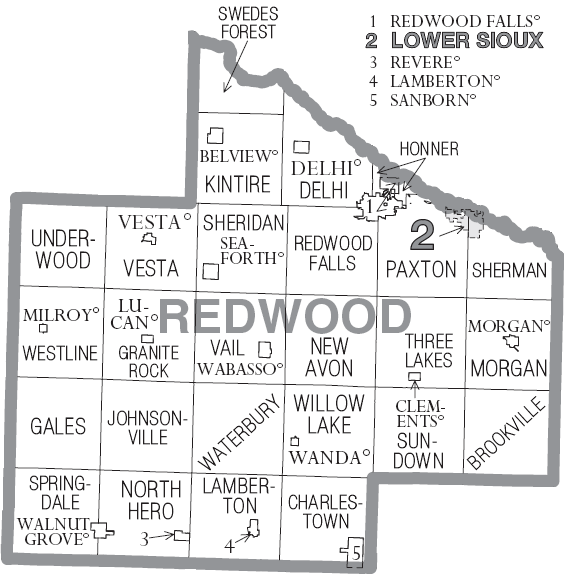
- Cities and townships of Redwood County
- Coordinates: 44°19′53″N 95°25′11″W
- Country: United States
- State: Minnesota
- County: Redwood

Area
  - Total: 36.6 sq mi (94.7 km^{2})
  - Land: 36.5 sq mi (94.6 km^{2})
  - Water: 0.039 sq mi (0.1 km^{2})
- Elevation: 1,106 ft (337 m)

Population (2000)
  - Total: 166
  - Density: 4.7/sq mi (1.8/km^{2})
- Time zone: UTC-6 (Central (CST))
  - Summer (DST): UTC-5 (CDT)
- FIPS code: 27-32048
- GNIS feature ID: 0664586

Johnsonville Township is one of the twenty-six townships of Redwood County, Minnesota, United States.

Johnsonville Township was organized in 1879, and named for the fact many of its original settlers had the surname Johnson.

== Geography ==
According to the United States Census Bureau, the township has a total area of 36 square miles (93 km^{2}), of which 36.5 square miles (95 km^{2}) is land and 0.1 square miles (0.26 km^{2}) (0.14%) is water.

No municipalities are located in Johnsonville Township.

== Demographics ==
As of the census of 2000, there were 166 people, 58 households, and 49 families residing in the township. The population density was 4.5 inhabitants per square mile (1.7/km^{2}). There were 66 housing units at an average density of 1.8 per square mile (0.69/km^{2}). The racial makeup of the township was 98.80% White, 0.60% Asian, and 0.60% from two or more races.

There were 58 households, out of which 37.9% had children under the age of 18 living with them, 82.8% were married couples living together, and 13.8% were non-families. 10.3% of all households were made up of individuals, and 1.7% had someone living alone who was 65 years of age or older. The average household size was 2.86 and the average family size was 3.12.

In the township the population was spread out, with 29.5% under the age of 18, 6.0% from 18 to 24, 27.7% from 25 to 44, 22.3% from 45 to 64, and 14.5% who were 65 years of age or older. The median age was 34 years. For every 100 females, there were 97.6 males. For every 100 females age 18 and over, there were 101.7 males.

The median income for a household in the township was $44,167, and the median income for a family was $48,438. Males had a median income of $23,333 versus $19,688 for females. The per capita income for the township was $16,611. About 6.7% of families and 4.9% of the population were below the poverty line, including none of those under the age of eighteen and 23.8% of those 65 or over.
