= Redwood County, Minnesota =

County in Minnesota, United States

- County
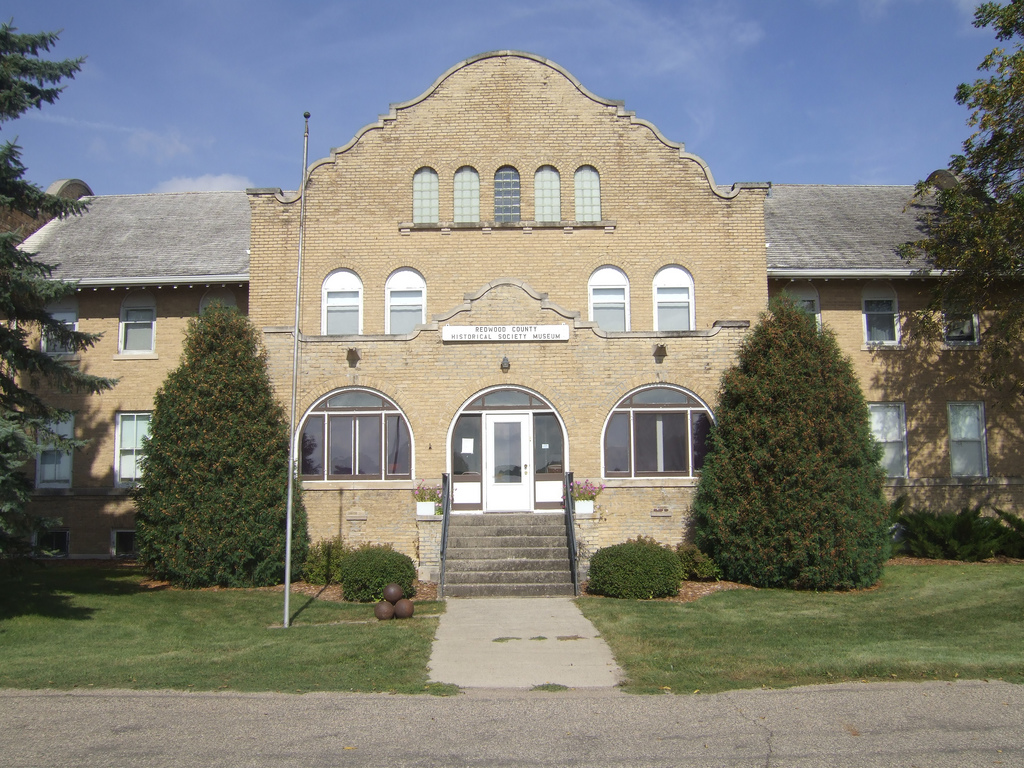
- Redwood County Historical Society Museum

- Location within the U.S. state of Minnesota
- Coordinates: 44°24′N 95°15′W
- Country: United States
- State: Minnesota
- Founded: February 6, 1862
- Named for: Redwood River
- Seat: Redwood Falls
- Largest city: Redwood Falls

Area
  - Total: 882 sq mi (2,280 km^{2})
  - Land: 879 sq mi (2,280 km^{2})
  - Water: 3.2 sq mi (8.3 km^{2}) 0.4%

Population (2020)
  - Total: 15,425
  - Estimate (2025): 15,265 ▼
  - Density: 17.5/sq mi (6.78/km^{2})
- Time zone: UTC−6 (Central)
  - Summer (DST): UTC−5 (CDT)
- Congressional district: 7th
- Website: redwoodcounty-mn.gov

Redwood County is a county in the U.S. state of Minnesota. As of the 2020 census the population was 15,425. Its county seat is Redwood Falls, along the Redwood River near its confluence with the Minnesota River. The Lower Sioux Indian Reservation (also known as the Mdewakankton Tribal Reservation) is entirely within the county, along the southern bank of the Minnesota River in Paxton and Sherman townships. In the 2000 census it had a population of 335.

== History ==
The Minnesota Legislature created the county on February 8, 1862, with Redwood Falls as the county seat. It was named for the Redwood River, which flows eastward through the county.

== Geography ==
The Minnesota River flows southeast along the county's northeastern border. The Redwood River flows east through the upper part of the county, draining into the Minnesota near Redwood Falls. The Cottonwood River flows east through the lower part of the county, entering adjacent Brown County before discharging into the Minnesota. The county terrain consists of rolling hills, carved with drainages and sprinkled with lakes. The largely rural area is devoted to commodity crops of corn and soybeans. The terrain slopes to the east, with its highest point in the southwest corner at 1,450 ft (440 m) ASL. The county has a total area of 882 square miles (2,280 km^{2}), of which 879 square miles (2,280 km^{2}) is land and 3.2 square miles (8.3 km^{2}) (0.4%) is water.

Soils of Redwood County

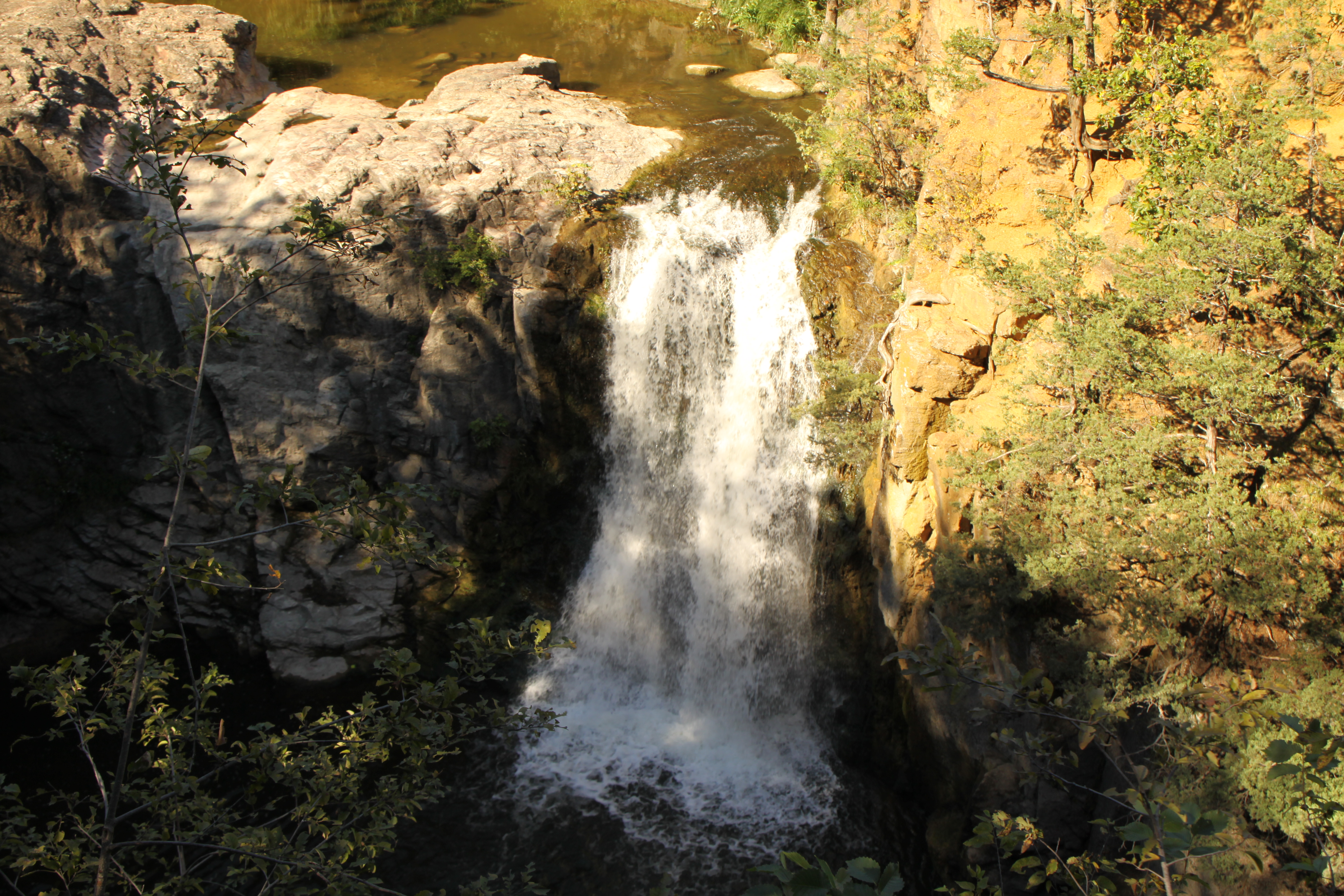
Ramsey Falls

=== Airports ===
- Redwood Falls Municipal Airport (RWF)

=== Major highways ===
- U.S. Highway 14
- U.S. Highway 71
- Minnesota State Highway 19
- Minnesota State Highway 67
- Minnesota State Highway 68
- Minnesota State Highway 330

=== Adjacent counties ===
- Renville County - northeast
- Brown County - east
- Cottonwood County - south
- Murray County - southwest
- Lyon County - west
- Yellow Medicine County - northwest

=== Lakes ===
- Daubs Lake
- Gales Lake
- Lake Francis
- Lake Redwood
- Long Lake
- Three Lakes
- Tiger Lake

=== Protected areas ===
- Alexander Ramsey State Park
- Cedar Mountain Scientific and Natural Area
- Cedar Rock Scientific and Natural Area
- Daubs Lake State Wildlife Management Area
- Delhi State Wildlife Management Area
- Gales State Wildlife Management Area
- Honner State Wildlife Management Area
- Klabunde State Wildlife Management Area
- Luescher-Barnum State Wildlife Management Area
- Mammenga State Wildlife Management Area
- Paul State Wildlife Management Area
- Rohlik State Wildlife Management Area
- Swedes Forest Scientific and Natural Area (part)
- Waterbury State Wildlife Management Area
- Westline State Wildlife Management Area
- Willow Lake State Wildlife Management Area

== Demographics ==
Historical population
Census	Pop.	Note	%±
1870	1,829		—
1880	5,375		193.9%
1890	9,886		83.9%
1900	17,261		74.6%
1910	18,425		6.7%
1920	20,908		13.5%
1930	20,620		−1.4%
1940	22,290		8.1%
1950	22,127		−0.7%
1960	21,718		−1.8%
1970	20,024		−7.8%
1980	19,341		−3.4%
1990	17,254		−10.8%
2000	16,815		−2.5%
2010	16,059		−4.5%
2020	15,425		−3.9%
2025 (est.)	15,265	▼	−1.0%
U.S. Decennial Census; 1790-1960 1900-1990; 1990-2000 2010-2020

=== Racial and ethnic composition ===
Redwood County, Minnesota – Racial and ethnic composition Note: the US Census treats Hispanic/Latino as an ethnic category. This table excludes Latinos from the racial categories and assigns them to a separate category. Hispanics/Latinos may be of any race.
Race / Ethnicity (NH = Non-Hispanic)	Pop 1980	Pop 1990	Pop 2000	Pop 2010	Pop 2020	% 1980	% 1990	% 2000	% 2010	% 2020
White alone (NH)	19,068	16,832	15,879	14,119	13,123	98.59%	97.55%	94.43%	87.92%	85.08%
Black or African American alone (NH)	2	27	22	71	76	0.01%	0.16%	0.13%	0.44%	0.49%
Native American or Alaska Native alone (NH)	140	272	526	744	774	0.72%	1.58%	3.13%	4.63%	5.02%
Asian alone (NH)	48	31	53	504	414	0.25%	0.18%	0.32%	3.14%	2.68%
Native Hawaiian or Pacific Islander alone (NH)	x	x	9	2	1	x	x	0.05%	0.01%	0.01%
Other race alone (NH)	13	1	1	3	16	0.07%	0.01%	0.01%	0.02%	0.10%
Mixed race or Multiracial (NH)	x	x	133	281	525	x	x	0.79%	1.75%	3.40%
Hispanic or Latino (any race)	70	91	192	335	496	0.36%	0.53%	1.14%	2.09%	3.22%
Total	19,341	17,254	16,815	16,059	15,425	100.00%	100.00%	100.00%	100.00%	100.00%

=== 2020 census ===
As of the 2020 census, the county had a population of 15,425. The median age was 40.8 years. 25.3% of residents were under the age of 18 and 20.7% of residents were 65 years of age or older. For every 100 females there were 102.1 males, and for every 100 females age 18 and over there were 100.7 males age 18 and over.

The racial makeup of the county was 85.9% White, 0.5% Black or African American, 5.5% American Indian and Alaska Native, 2.7% Asian, <0.1% Native Hawaiian and Pacific Islander, 0.8% from some other race, and 4.6% from two or more races. Hispanic or Latino residents of any race comprised 3.2% of the population.

29.9% of residents lived in urban areas, while 70.1% lived in rural areas.

There were 6,318 households in the county, of which 28.3% had children under the age of 18 living in them. Of all households, 50.1% were married-couple households, 20.4% were households with a male householder and no spouse or partner present, and 22.6% were households with a female householder and no spouse or partner present. About 31.5% of all households were made up of individuals and 14.8% had someone living alone who was 65 years of age or older.

There were 7,086 housing units, of which 10.8% were vacant. Among occupied housing units, 78.6% were owner-occupied and 21.4% were renter-occupied. The homeowner vacancy rate was 1.8% and the rental vacancy rate was 15.2%.

=== 2000 census ===
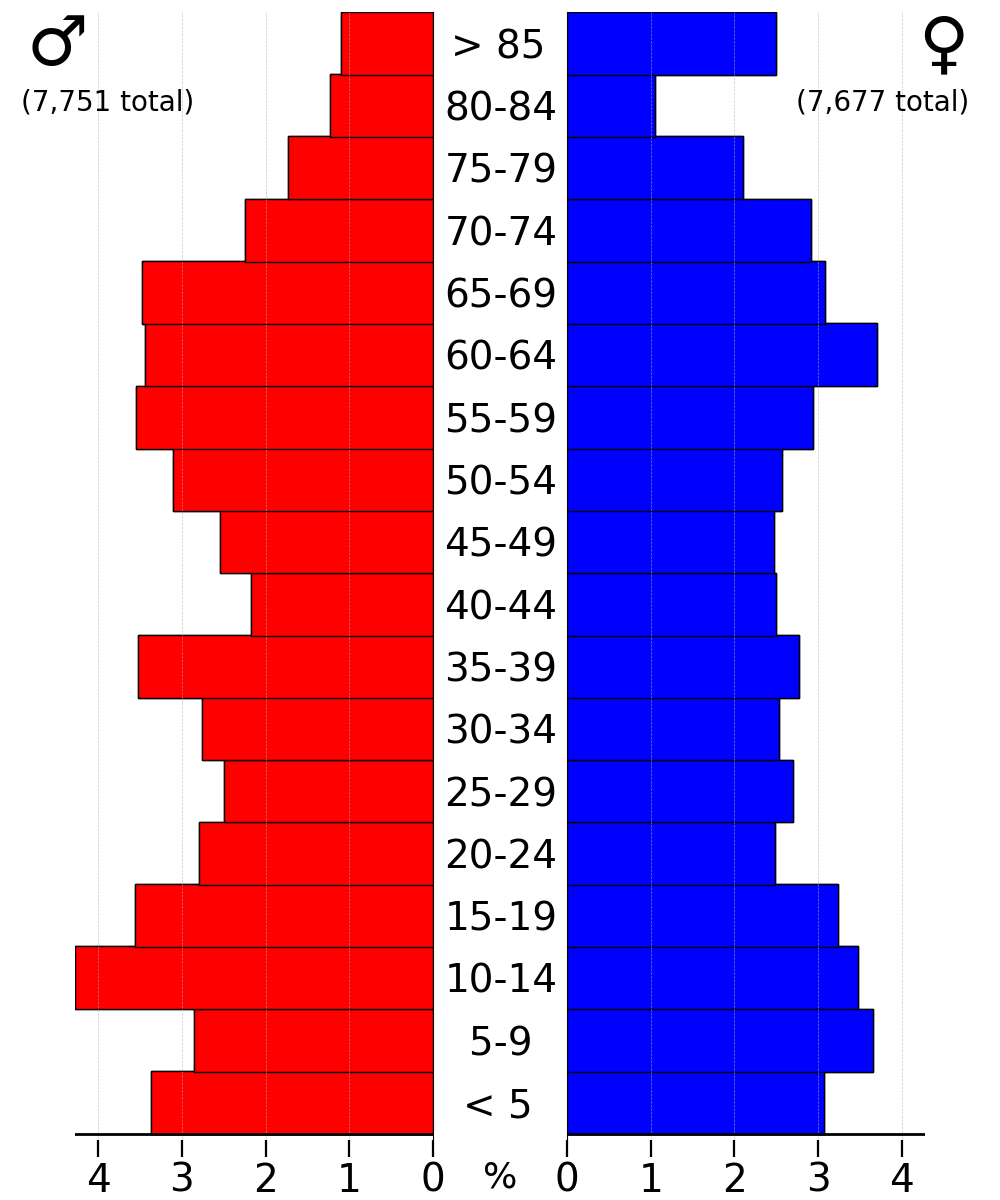
2022 US Census population pyramid for Redwood County, from ACS 5-year estimates

As of the census of 2000, the county had 16,815 people, 6,674 households, and 4,524 families. The population density was 19.1 per square mile (7.4/km^{2}). There were 7,230 housing units at an average density of 8.23 per square mile (3.18/km^{2}). The county's racial makeup was 94.97% White, 0.13% Black or African American, 3.24% Native American, 0.32% Asian, 0.07% Pacific Islander, 0.43% from other races, and 0.85% from two or more races. 1.14% of the population were Hispanic or Latino of any race. 55.8% were of German and 13.7% Norwegian ancestry.

There were 6,674 households, of which 31.50% had children under the age of 18 living with them, 57.30% were married couples living together, 7.10% had a female householder with no husband present, and 32.20% were non-families. 28.80% of all households were made up of individuals, and 14.70% had someone living alone who was 65 years of age or older. The average household size was 2.44 and the average family size was 3.02.

26.50% of the county's population was under age 18, 6.60% was from age 18 to 24, 24.80% was from age 25 to 44, 22.70% was from age 45 to 64, and 19.30% was age 65 or older. The median age was 40 years. For every 100 females there were 99.70 males. For every 100 females age 18 and over, there were 96.50 males.

The county's median household income was $37,352, and the median family income was $46,250. Males had a median income of $30,251 versus $21,481 for females. The county's per capita income was $18,903. About 5.50% of families and 7.70% of the population were below the poverty line, including 8.30% of those under age 18 and 8.80% of those age 65 or over.

== Communities ==
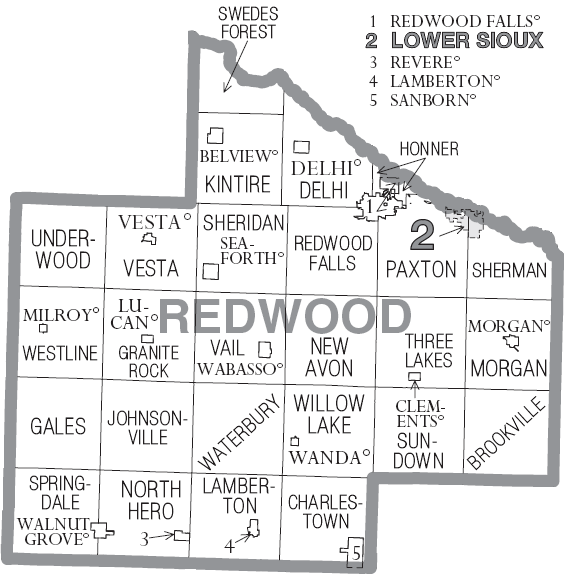
Cities and townships of Redwood County

=== Cities ===
- Belview
- Clements
- Delhi
- Lamberton
- Lucan
- Milroy
- Morgan
- Redwood Falls (county seat)
- Revere
- Sanborn
- Seaforth
- Vesta
- Wabasso
- Walnut Grove
- Wanda

=== Unincorporated communities ===
- Gilfillan
- Lower Sioux Indian Community
- Morton (part)
- Rowena

=== Townships ===
- Brookville Township
- Charlestown Township
- Delhi Township
- Gales Township
- Granite Rock Township
- Honner Township
- Johnsonville Township
- Kintire Township
- Lamberton Township
- Morgan Township
- New Avon Township
- North Hero Township
- Paxton Township
- Redwood Falls Township
- Sheridan Township
- Sherman Township
- Springdale Township
- Sundown Township
- Swedes Forest Township
- Three Lakes Township
- Underwood Township
- Vail Township
- Vesta Township
- Waterbury Township
- Westline Township
- Willow Lake Township

== Politics ==
Redwood County is a reliably Republican county. In only one national election since 1948 has the county selected the Democratic Party candidate, and even then, the margin of victory was under 2%.

United States presidential election results for Redwood County, Minnesota
Year	Republican		Democratic		Third party(ies)	
Year	No.	%	No.	%	No.	%
1892	1,155	43.54%	645	24.31%	853	32.15%
1896	1,818	60.60%	1,123	37.43%	59	1.97%
1900	2,127	66.45%	918	28.68%	156	4.87%
1904	2,194	79.64%	462	16.77%	99	3.59%
1908	1,821	59.86%	1,076	35.37%	145	4.77%
1912	542	17.08%	1,126	35.48%	1,506	47.45%
1916	2,029	56.98%	1,361	38.22%	171	4.80%
1920	5,589	83.07%	880	13.08%	259	3.85%
1924	3,342	50.66%	443	6.72%	2,812	42.63%
1928	5,111	63.18%	2,899	35.84%	79	0.98%
1932	2,634	35.21%	4,727	63.20%	119	1.59%
1936	3,286	36.63%	4,965	55.34%	721	8.04%
1940	6,105	62.41%	3,637	37.18%	40	0.41%
1944	5,428	65.06%	2,886	34.59%	29	0.35%
1948	4,160	49.26%	4,182	49.52%	103	1.22%
1952	7,093	72.30%	2,695	27.47%	22	0.22%
1956	5,956	66.13%	3,039	33.74%	11	0.12%
1960	5,893	60.47%	3,839	39.39%	14	0.14%
1964	4,546	49.00%	4,722	50.90%	9	0.10%
1968	5,134	55.29%	3,680	39.63%	471	5.07%
1972	5,776	62.43%	3,177	34.34%	299	3.23%
1976	4,926	50.15%	4,525	46.07%	371	3.78%
1980	5,993	61.79%	2,952	30.44%	754	7.77%
1984	6,020	66.45%	2,957	32.64%	82	0.91%
1988	5,076	60.73%	3,178	38.02%	104	1.24%
1992	3,408	38.24%	2,740	30.74%	2,765	31.02%
1996	3,700	47.13%	2,997	38.17%	1,154	14.70%
2000	4,589	59.23%	2,681	34.60%	478	6.17%
2004	4,898	60.18%	3,104	38.14%	137	1.68%
2008	4,308	55.19%	3,250	41.63%	248	3.18%
2012	4,570	58.66%	3,008	38.61%	212	2.72%
2016	5,137	67.49%	1,887	24.79%	587	7.71%
2020	5,771	69.66%	2,355	28.43%	158	1.91%
2024	5,895	70.80%	2,300	27.62%	131	1.57%

== See also ==
- National Register of Historic Places listings in Redwood County, Minnesota
