= Vesta, Minnesota =

City in Minnesota, United States

Vesta
- City
- Cities and townships of Redwood County
- Coordinates: 44°30′24″N 95°24′51″W
- Country: United States
- State: Minnesota
- County: Redwood

Area
  - Total: 0.41 sq mi (1.05 km^{2})
  - Land: 0.41 sq mi (1.05 km^{2})
  - Water: 0 sq mi (0.00 km^{2})
- Elevation: 1,056 ft (322 m)

Population (2020)
  - Total: 276
  - Density: 682.6/sq mi (263.57/km^{2})
- Time zone: UTC-6 (Central (CST))
  - Summer (DST): UTC-5 (CDT)
- ZIP codes: 56287, 56292
- Area code: 507
- FIPS code: 27-66982
- GNIS feature ID: 2397132
- Website: www.vestamn.us

Vesta is a city in Redwood County, Minnesota, United States. As of the 2020 census, Vesta had a population of 276.

== Geography ==
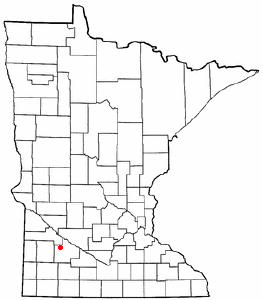
Location of Vesta, Minnesota

According to the United States Census Bureau, the city has a total area of 0.41 square miles (1.06 km^{2}), all land. The Redwood River flows through the southeastern corner of the city.

Minnesota Highway 19 skirts the western edge of Vesta.

== History ==
Vesta was platted in 1899, and named after Vesta, Roman goddess of the hearth and home. Vesta was incorporated in 1900.

== Demographics ==
Historical population
| Census | Pop. | Note | %± |
|---|---|---|---|
| 1900 | 214 | | — |
| 1910 | 243 | | 13.6% |
| 1920 | 334 | | 37.4% |
| 1930 | 310 | | −7.2% |
| 1940 | 334 | | 7.7% |
| 1950 | 340 | | 1.8% |
| 1960 | 318 | | −6.5% |
| 1970 | 330 | | 3.8% |
| 1980 | 360 | | 9.1% |
| 1990 | 302 | | −16.1% |
| 2000 | 339 | | 12.3% |
| 2010 | 319 | | −5.9% |
| 2020 | 276 | | −13.5% |
U.S. Decennial Census

=== 2010 census ===
As of the census of 2010, there were 319 people, 124 households, and 83 families living in the city. The population density was 778.0 inhabitants per square mile (300.4/km^{2}). There were 136 housing units at an average density of 331.7 per square mile (128.1/km^{2}). The racial makeup of the city was 94.7% White, 0.9% African American, 0.6% Native American, 1.9% Asian, and 1.9% from two or more races.

There were 124 households, of which 37.9% had children under the age of 18 living with them, 54.8% were married couples living together, 8.1% had a female householder with no husband present, 4.0% had a male householder with no wife present, and 33.1% were non-families. 29.0% of all households were made up of individuals, and 19.3% had someone living alone who was 65 years of age or older. The average household size was 2.57 and the average family size was 3.24.

The median age in the city was 33.5 years. 28.5% of residents were under the age of 18; 8.8% were between the ages of 18 and 24; 26.1% were from 25 to 44; 17.3% were from 45 to 64; and 19.4% were 65 years of age or older. The gender makeup of the city was 47.6% male and 52.4% female.

=== 2000 census ===
As of the census of 2000, there were 339 people, 132 households, and 86 families living in the city. The population density was 853.2 inhabitants per square mile (329.4/km^{2}). There were 142 housing units at an average density of 357.4 per square mile (138.0/km^{2}). The racial makeup of the city was 98.53% White, 0.29% Asian, and 1.18% from two or more races. Hispanic or Latino of any race were 0.88% of the population.

There were 132 households, out of which 32.6% had children under the age of 18 living with them, 53.8% were married couples living together, 9.1% had a female householder with no husband present, and 34.8% were non-families. 32.6% of all households were made up of individuals, and 22.0% had someone living alone who was 65 years of age or older. The average household size was 2.57 and the average family size was 3.36.

In the city, the population was spread out, with 31.6% under the age of 18, 8.8% from 18 to 24, 23.0% from 25 to 44, 15.9% from 45 to 64, and 20.6% who were 65 years of age or older. The median age was 35 years. For every 100 females, there were 90.4 males. For every 100 females age 18 and over, there were 84.1 males.

The median income for a household in the city was $25,536, and the median income for a family was $34,583. Males had a median income of $22,500 versus $19,000 for females. The per capita income for the city was $12,302. About 9.3% of families and 14.3% of the population were below the poverty line, including 22.1% of those under age 18 and 13.8% of those age 65 or over.
