= Lucan, Minnesota =

City in Minnesota, United States

Lucan
- City
- Cities and townships of Redwood County
- Coordinates: 44°24′33″N 95°24′42″W
- Country: United States
- State: Minnesota
- County: Redwood

Area
  - Total: 0.39 sq mi (1.02 km^{2})
  - Land: 0.39 sq mi (1.02 km^{2})
  - Water: 0 sq mi (0.00 km^{2})
- Elevation: 1,089 ft (332 m)

Population (2020)
  - Total: 214
  - Density: 541.5/sq mi (209.07/km^{2})
- Time zone: UTC-6 (Central (CST))
  - Summer (DST): UTC-5 (CDT)
- ZIP code: 56255
- Area code: 507
- FIPS code: 27-38420
- GNIS feature ID: 0647278
- Website: https://www.lucanmn.net/

Lucan is a city in Redwood County, Minnesota, United States. The population was 214 at the 2020 census.

== History ==
Lucan was platted in 1902. It was named after Lucan, in Ireland. The city was incorporated in 1904. A post office called Lucan has been in operation since 1908.

== Geography ==
According to the United States Census Bureau, the city has a total area of 0.38 square miles (0.98 km^{2}), all land.

Lucan is located along County Road 10, less than one mile (1.6 km) north of Minnesota Highway 68, an east–west highway.

== Demographics ==
Historical population
| Census | Pop. | Note | %± |
|---|---|---|---|
| 1910 | 98 | | — |
| 1920 | 181 | | 84.7% |
| 1930 | 182 | | 0.6% |
| 1940 | 226 | | 24.2% |
| 1950 | 246 | | 8.8% |
| 1960 | 216 | | −12.2% |
| 1970 | 254 | | 17.6% |
| 1980 | 262 | | 3.1% |
| 1990 | 235 | | −10.3% |
| 2000 | 226 | | −3.8% |
| 2010 | 191 | | −15.5% |
| 2020 | 214 | | 12.0% |
U.S. Decennial Census

=== 2010 census ===
As of the census of 2010, there were 191 people, 92 households, and 48 families living in the city. The population density was 502.6 inhabitants per square mile (194.1/km^{2}). There were 110 housing units at an average density of 289.5 per square mile (111.8/km^{2}). The racial makeup of the city was 99.5% White and 0.5% Native American. Hispanic or Latino of any race were 0.5% of the population.

There were 92 households, of which 22.8% had children under the age of 18 living with them, 48.9% were married couples living together, 3.3% had a female householder with no husband present, and 47.8% were non-families. 44.6% of all households were made up of individuals, and 13.1% had someone living alone who was 65 years of age or older. The average household size was 2.08 and the average family size was 2.98.

The median age in the city was 40.4 years. 24.6% of residents were under the age of 18; 4.2% were between the ages of 18 and 24; 26.3% were from 25 to 44; 28.7% were from 45 to 64; and 16.2% were 65 years of age or older. The gender makeup of the city was 51.3% male and 48.7% female.

=== 2000 census ===
As of the census of 2000, there were 226 people, 100 households, and 61 families living in the city. The population density was 600.5 inhabitants per square mile (231.9/km^{2}). There were 108 housing units at an average density of 287.0 per square mile (110.8/km^{2}). The racial makeup of the city was 96.90% White, 0.44% African American, 1.77% from other races, and 0.88% from two or more races. Hispanic or Latino of any race were 1.77% of the population.

There were 100 households, out of which 26.0% had children under the age of 18 living with them, 54.0% were married couples living together, 5.0% had a female householder with no husband present, and 39.0% were non-families. 31.0% of all households were made up of individuals, and 15.0% had someone living alone who was 65 years of age or older. The average household size was 2.26 and the average family size was 2.92.

In the city, the population was spread out, with 21.2% under the age of 18, 11.9% from 18 to 24, 21.7% from 25 to 44, 20.4% from 45 to 64, and 24.8% who were 65 years of age or older. The median age was 40 years. For every 100 females, there were 93.2 males. For every 100 females age 18 and over, there were 100.0 males.

The median income for a household in the city was $33,125, and the median income for a family was $38,750. Males had a median income of $28,438 versus $20,625 for females. The per capita income for the city was $19,838. None of the families and 2.7% of the population were living below the poverty line, including no under eighteens and 5.1% of those over 64.
