= Charlestown Township, Redwood County, Minnesota =

Charlestown Township, Minnesota
- Township
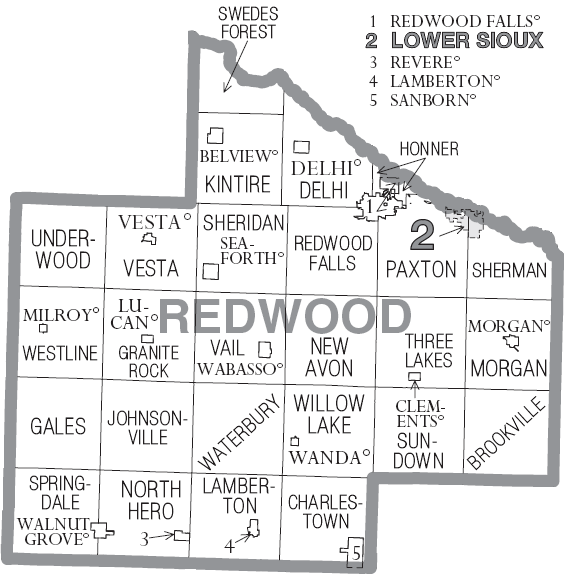
- Cities and townships of Redwood County
- Coordinates: 44°14′45″N 95°9′30″W
- Country: United States
- State: Minnesota
- County: Redwood

Area
  - Total: 33.9 sq mi (87.7 km^{2})
  - Land: 33.8 sq mi (87.6 km^{2})
  - Water: 0 sq mi (0.0 km^{2})
- Elevation: 1,109 ft (338 m)

Population (2000)
  - Total: 217
  - Density: 6.5/sq mi (2.5/km^{2})
- Time zone: UTC-6 (Central (CST))
  - Summer (DST): UTC-5 (CDT)
- FIPS code: 27-10936
- GNIS feature ID: 0663783

Charlestown Township is one of the twenty-six townships of Redwood County, Minnesota, United States. The population was 217 at the 2000 census.

Charlestown Township was organized in 1872, and named for Charles Porter, a pioneer settler.

== Geography ==
According to the United States Census Bureau, the township has a total area of 33.8 square miles (88 km^{2}), of which 33.8 square miles (88 km^{2}) is land and 0.03% is water.

The city of Sanborn is located in Charlestown Township.

== Demographics ==
As of the census of 2000, there were 217 people, 86 households, and 70 families residing in the township. The population density was 6.4 inhabitants per square mile (2.5/km^{2}). There were 95 housing units at an average density of 2.8 per square mile (1.1/km^{2}). The racial makeup of the township was 98.16% White, 0.46% Pacific Islander, and 1.38% from two or more races.

There were 86 households, out of which 29.1% had children under the age of 18 living with them, 76.7% were married couples living together, 2.3% had a female householder with no husband present, and 18.6% were non-families. 12.8% of all households were made up of individuals, and 2.3% had someone living alone who was 65 years of age or older. The average household size was 2.52 and the average family size was 2.80.

In the township the population was spread out, with 24.0% under the age of 18, 5.1% from 18 to 24, 22.6% from 25 to 44, 35.5% from 45 to 64, and 12.9% who were 65 years of age or older. The median age was 44 years. For every 100 females, there were 126.0 males. For every 100 females age 18 and over, there were 120.0 males.

The median income for a household in the township was $44,688, and the median income for a family was $46,500. Males had a median income of $27,000 versus $23,125 for females. The per capita income for the township was $20,984. About 4.1% of families and 6.8% of the population were below the poverty line, including 10.6% of those under the age of eighteen and 8.0% of those 65 or over.
