= Betsy and Tacy Go Over the Big Hill =

Book by Maud Hart Lovelace

- First edition
- Author: Maud Hart Lovelace
- Illustrator: Lois Lenski
- Language: English
- Series: Betsy-Tacy
- Release number: 3
- Genre: Children's fiction
- Set in: Deep Valley, Minnesota (1902)
- Publisher: Thomas Y. Crowell Co., HarperCollins
- Publication date: 1942
- Publication place: United States
- Media type: Print
- Pages: 171
- ISBN: 0-690-13521-1
- Dewey Decimal: 813.52
- Preceded by: Betsy-Tacy and Tib (1941)
- Followed by: Betsy and Tacy Go Downtown (1943)

Betsy and Tacy Go Over the Big Hill (1942) is the third volume in the Betsy-Tacy series by Maud Hart Lovelace. The book, along with the entire Betsy-Tacy and Deep Valley series, was republished in 2000 by HarperTrophy with a new cover art illustrated by Michael Koelsch.

== Plot overview ==
While the first two volumes are something like collections of vignettes about Betsy, Tacy, and Tib, this one has a story through the whole volume.

The girls are competing with Betsy's and Tacy's older sisters about having a Queen of Summer. When they go out to collect votes, they find themselves making friends with a surprising little girl their own age in the Little Syria section of Deep Valley, Minnesota.

== Trivia ==
Betsy and Tacy first sing their "Cat Duet" at the school entertainment in this book.
