= Betsy and Tacy Go Downtown =

- First edition
- Author: Maud Hart Lovelace
- Illustrator: Lois Lenski
- Language: English
- Series: Betsy-Tacy
- Release number: 4
- Genre: Children's fiction
- Set in: Deep Valley, Minnesota (1904)
- Publisher: Thomas Y. Crowell Co., HarperCollins
- Publication date: 1943
- Publication place: United States
- Media type: Print
- Pages: 180
- ISBN: 0-690-13450-9
- Dewey Decimal: 813.52
- Preceded by: Betsy and Tacy Go Over the Big Hill (1942)
- Followed by: Heaven to Betsy (1945)

Betsy and Tacy Go Downtown (1943) is the fourth volume in the Betsy-Tacy series by Maud Hart Lovelace. The book, along with the entire Betsy-Tacy and Deep Valley series, was republished in 2000 by HarperTrophy with a new cover art illustrated by Michael Koelsch.

== Plot ==
In this volume in the series, horseless carriages arrive in Deep Valley for the first time when Mr. Poppy, the owner of the Opera House, buys an automobile. Betsy's friend Tib is his first passenger — along with his wife — due simply to her having the boldness to ask for a ride. Although the girls' classmate Winona Root is initially jealous of Tib over this experience, she soon gets over it and invites Betsy, Tacy, and Tib to their first real theatrical experience, a dramatized version of Uncle Tom's Cabin at the Opera House. Betsy befriends the lonely Mrs. Poppy, who welcomes the chance to share the little girls' affection after having lost her only daughter in the years before moving to town. Through this friendship, the girls not only enjoy parties at the Poppy Hotel, but also participate in a theatrical production of Rip Van Winkle that lets Mrs. Poppy reunite Betsy's mother, Mrs. Ray, with her long-lost brother.

Betsy and her friends also discover the temptations of dime novels, prompting Betsy to try her hand at writing her own. Eventually, Betsy shares her secret writings with her mother, who successfully encourages her to write fiction of more elevated character. Betsy's parents decide that in order to foster a love of classic literature and make Betsy a better writer, she will be allowed to go alone to the new Carnegie library every two weeks, with spending money for a special mid-day treat to let her stay all day.
