= Betsy-Tacy Houses =

Historic houses in Mankato, Minnesota, US

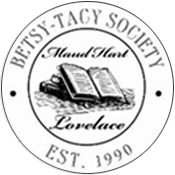

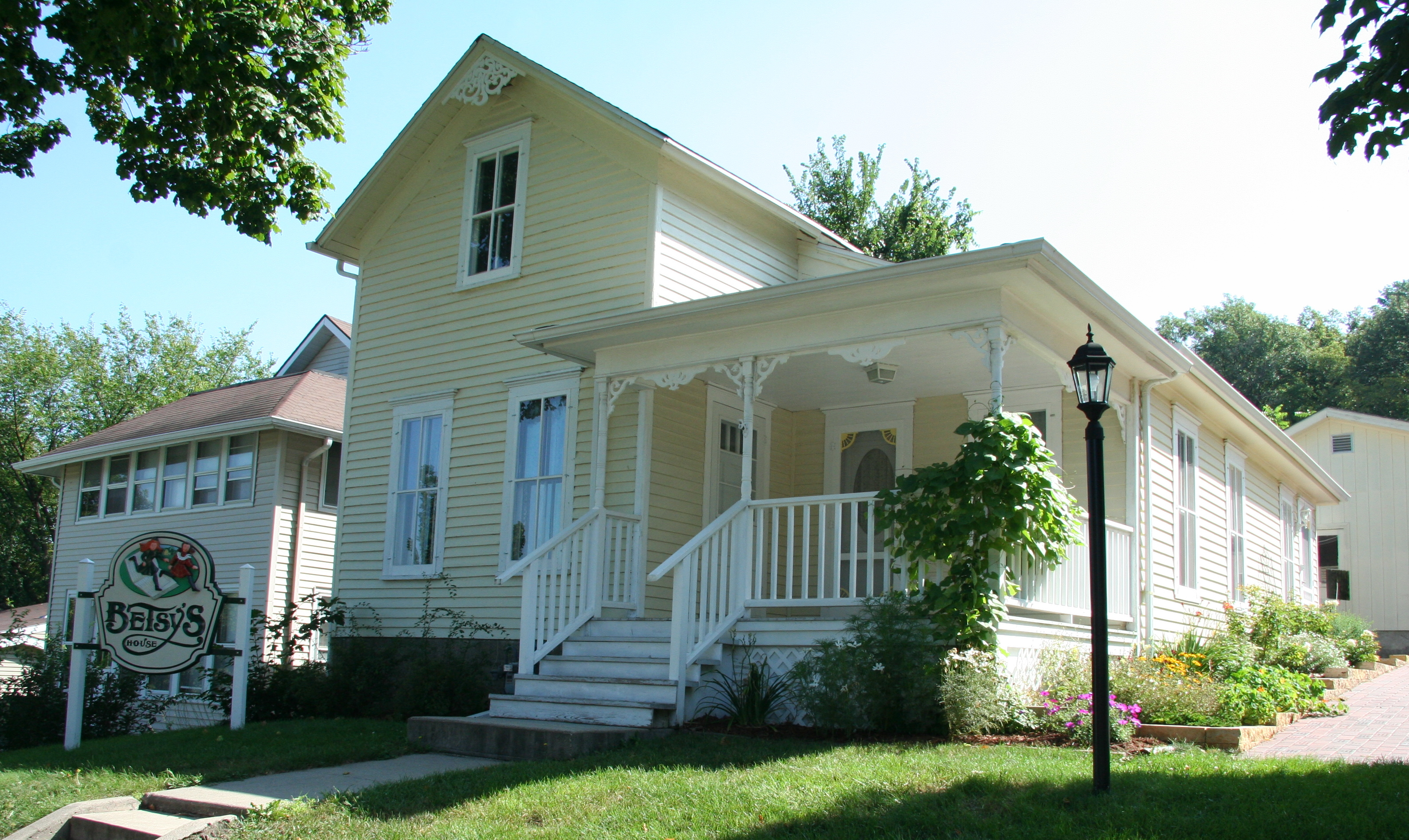
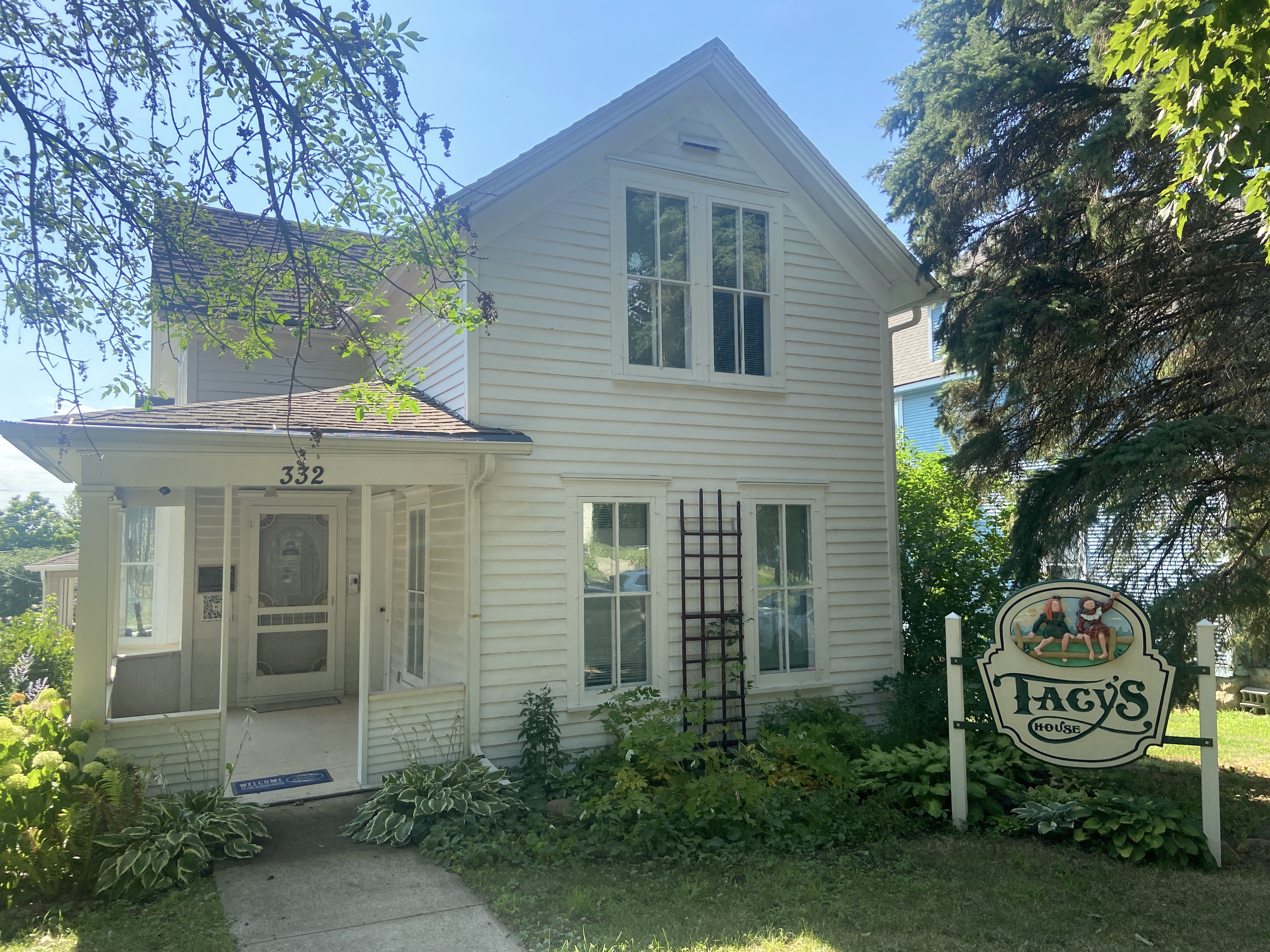
- Betsy's House (Maud Hart Lovelace) Tacy's House (Frances Kenney)
- Established: 1990
- Location: 333 Center Street Mankato, Minnesota
- Type: Literary History
- Website: betsy-tacysociety.org

The Betsy-Tacy Houses are a pair of historic houses in Mankato, Minnesota that were the childhood homes of author Maud Hart Lovelace and her childhood friend, Frances Kenney. Lovelace used these houses as the basis for the settings of her popular "Betsy-Tacy" book series. The houses are owned and operated together as a museum by the Betsy-Tacy Society.

== History ==
The childhood homes of Maud Hart Lovelace (Betsy) and Frances Kenney (Tacy), based in Mankato, Minnesota, served to inspire the fictionalised "Deep Valley" of the "Betsy-Tacy" books. As of 2009, the properties are owned and maintained by the Society.

Both houses are located on Center Street located in the historic Lincoln Park neighborhood of Mankato, Minnesota and are within shouting distance of each other, reflecting the close proximity and friendship between Betsy and Tacy in the books.

=== Betsy's House ===
Maud Hart Lovelace's house located at 333 Center Street her home from 1892 to 1906. Now a museum run by the Betsy-Tacy Society they offer tours that recreate the atmosphere of Maud's childhood. There is a historical marker outside the house commemorating its significance.

=== Tacy's House ===
Frances Kenney's house located at 332 Center Street is directly across from Maud's house, this was her home from 1898 to 1911. Though not a museum itself, the house stands as a companion to Maud's house, and serves as an interpretive center and gift shop.

== Restoration ==
The Society purchased and restored Frances Kenney's home in 1995 and Maud's home in 2001. Maud's home's restoration was featured on the PBS television program “Hometime.” Restorations to the homes aimed to recreate the look and feel of the houses during the late 19th and early 20th centuries. They even used illustrations from the Betsy-Tacy books to guide the restoration, ensuring details matched the fictional descriptions. While some original items from Maud's family home are present, most furniture and decor are period-appropriate reproductions.

== Literary Landmark ==
On May 20, 2010, Betsy's House, the childhood home of Maud Hart Lovelace, alongside Tacy's House, the childhood home of her best friend, Frances "Bick" Kenney was designated as a Literary Landmark by the Association of Library Trustees, Advocates, Friends and Foundations, a division of the American Library Association (ALA).

== Betsy-Tacy Society ==
The Betsy-Tacy Society was founded in 1990 by a group of fans in Mankato, Minnesota. Their mission was to promote awareness of the books and preserve the local landmarks depicted by Maud Hart Lovelace.

Concerned about the Betsy-Tacy series going out of print, the Society launched a letter-writing campaign successfully convincing HarperCollins to reprint the first four books by 1992. Their efforts ultimately led to all ten Betsy-Tacy books and three Deep Valley books being back in print and still available today.

After their successful efforts getting the books back in print, the Society purchased and restored the childhood homes of Maud Hart (Betsy) and her best friend, Frances Kenney (Tacy) and opened the homes as museums for fans to experience the real-life settings of the books. Currently the Betsy-Tacy Society has over 700 members and an annual Betsy-Tacy convention.

== See also ==
- Betsy-Tacy (novel)
- Betsy-Tacy and Tib
- List of museums in Minnesota
