= Betsy and Joe =

Book by Maud Hart Lovelace

- First edition
- Author: Maud Hart Lovelace
- Illustrator: Vera Neville
- Language: English
- Series: Betsy-Tacy
- Release number: 8
- Genre: Historical fiction
- Set in: Deep Valley, Minnesota (1909-1910)
- Publisher: Thomas Y. Crowell Co., HarperCollins
- Publication date: 1948
- Publication place: United States
- Media type: Print
- Pages: 256
- Preceded by: Betsy Was a Junior (1947)
- Followed by: Betsy and the Great World (1952)

Betsy and Joe (1948) is the eighth volume in the Betsy-Tacy series by Maud Hart Lovelace. This installment spans the title characters' senior, or twelfth grade, year in high school. The book, along with the entire Betsy-Tacy and Deep Valley series, was republished in 2000 by HarperTrophy with a new cover art illustrated by Michael Koelsch.

== Plot summary ==
Betsy and Joe details the events of Betsy Ray's senior year (1909-1910) at Deep Valley High School in Deep Valley, Minnesota. Betsy had first met Joe Willard in the fifth book of the series, Heaven to Betsy, at Willard's Emporium, a store in the country owned by Joe's uncle. The two of them did not become close friends initially, as they competed in school for top marks in English class and in the annual high school essay competition. Joe's parents had died earlier, causing him to have to spend his time working to support himself and making him, in Betsy's opinion, proud.

At the end of the previous book, Betsy Was a Junior, Betsy's classmate, Joe Willard, sent her a postcard requesting to correspond over the summer while he was away working in the harvest fields. Joe soon moved to North Dakota to help run a newspaper, and over the summer while Betsy is away on vacation at Murmuring Lake, Betsy and Joe corresponded, Betsy on her "scented, greensealed" stationery replying to Joe's "typewritten letters." While at Murmuring Lake, Betsy is often visited by her good friend, Tony Markham. Tony tends to run with a wild crowd, so Betsy encourages his visits to keep him with the Crowd. In September, school begins, and Joe makes his first visit to Betsy's home and soon he comes every Sunday night for "Sunday Night Lunch." The first dance of the school year is announced, and to Betsy's dismay Tony asks her first. After Betsy explains the situation to Joe, he makes a blanket invitation for her to go to all the rest of the dances with him. Betsy declines because she feels it would be unfair to Tony to shut him out of her life like that, even though she only likes him as a friend.

The fall progresses with Tony and Joe both taking Betsy to various events, and soon it is time for the New Year's Eve dance. Again, Tony asks Betsy first — despite Betsy's having tried to give Joe a chance to invite her first — and Betsy feels she can't say no, so she accepts even though she would rather go with Joe. When Joe finds out, he is angry and says they should stop seeing one another. When school resumes after break, the two of them are no longer friends and scarcely talk to each other. Tony becomes more serious about Betsy. Just before Easter break, Tony tries to kiss Betsy and she tells him she only likes him as a friend. She then goes away for a week to visit friends of her father in the country, the Beidwinkles. At the end of the week, Betsy and the Beidwinkles visit Willard's Emporium, where Betsy and Joe meet again and rekindle their friendship in the place where it began. They spend the day together, and when they both return to Deep Valley they begin "going together." Tony leaves school to go work on Broadway in New York, and Joe and Betsy end the year happily "almost engaged."

== Other storylines ==
A football star, Ralph Maddox, moves to Deep Valley, and begins to go with Tib. The team suffers loss after loss due to his unwillingness to sacrifice his good looks for the win, until a skit at the final pep rally mocks him and Tib threatens to stop dating him unless they win.

Betsy's best friend, Tacy, turns 18 in February 1910, and soon meets Harry Kerr, a business associate of Mr. Ray's, who is roughly 10 years older than Tacy. After meeting the first time and spending the evening together at Sunday Night Lunch, Mr. Kerr tells Mr. Ray that he has decided he's going to marry Tacy, no matter how long he has to wait.

Up and Down Broadway, a home-talent play in Deep Valley, is put together involving several members of the Crowd.

Julia Ray spends the summer touring Europe and then studies opera in Germany while staying with a wealthy family in their castle.

== Main characters ==
Betsy Ray, a high school senior (class of 1910). She wants to be an author, and she sends out her stories to magazines in hopes of selling them.

Joe Willard, a high school senior. Orphaned when he was 12, he lived with his Uncle Alvin and Aunt Ruth until he came to Deep Valley for high school. He works for Mr. Root, the owner of the local newspaper.

Tacy Kelly, a high school senior and Betsy's best friend since they met at Betsy's birthday party when she was five years old.

Tib Muller, a high school senior and Betsy's other best friend.

Tony Markham, a high school senior and the "Tall Dark Stranger" Betsy fell in love with as a freshman, who has since become a good friend not only to Betsy but the entire Ray family.

Mrs. Ray, Betsy's mother.

Mr. Ray, Betsy's father, who owns a shoestore.

Margaret Ray, Betsy's sister who is five years younger than she is.

Julia Ray, Betsy's older sister who is spending the year studying opera in Europe.

Carney Sibley, a freshman at Vassar College and a former member of the Crowd.

The Crowd. Membership in the Crowd varies, but generally includes Betsy, Tacy, Tib, Carney, Alice Morrison, Irma Biscay, Hazel Smith, Dennie Farisy, Dave Hunt, Cab Edwards and Tony Markham. Other members come in and out.

== Other facts ==
- The quote at the beginning of the book is "All's well that ends well" by William Shakespeare.
- Maud Hart Lovelace dedicated Betsy and Joe to her husband, Delos Lovelace.
- The book is a fictionalized account of the author's senior year in high school. In fact, she did not meet Delos Lovelace until after high school. Julia's letters are based in large part on letters written by Maud's older sister, Kathleen, while on a similar trip.
