= Betsy-Tacy (novel) =

1940 novel by Maud Hart Lovelace

- First edition
- Author: Maud Hart Lovelace
- Illustrator: Lois Lenski
- Language: English
- Series: Betsy-Tacy
- Release number: 1
- Genre: Children's fiction
- Set in: Deep Valley, Minnesota (1897)
- Publisher: Thomas Y. Crowell Co., HarperCollins
- Publication date: 1940
- Publication place: United States
- Media type: Print
- Pages: 112
- ISBN: 978-0-06-440096-1
- Dewey Decimal: 813.52
- LC Class: PZ7.L9561
- Followed by: Betsy-Tacy and Tib (1941)

Betsy-Tacy (1940) is the first volume in the Betsy-Tacy series by Maud Hart Lovelace.

The book is mostly about the adventures of five-year-old Betsy Ray and her new best friend, Tacy Kelly. It takes place in fictional Deep Valley, Minnesota, based on Mankato, Minnesota, the author's home town. This first book is set in roughly 1898-1899. The book, along with the entire Betsy-Tacy and Deep Valley series, was republished in 2000 by HarperTrophy with a new cover art illustrated by Michael Koelsch.

== Plot ==
The adventures between the two friends range from the real life (such as going to school for the first time, making a playhouse out of a piano box, and dressing up to go calling) to the extraordinarily fanciful (such as being taken for a ride in the milkman's magic wagon by his talking horse, and flying away on a cloud while enjoying a picnic). The fanciful adventures are provided by Betsy's active imagination and her love of telling stories. The book deals with the themes of shyness, with the birth of new siblings, with the joys of an active imaginations, and even touches on death within the family.

== Main characters ==
Betsy Ray (Elizabeth Warrington Ray)- the main character of the series, based on Maud Hart Lovelace herself as a child. Betsy is a gregarious, imaginative child. She dreams of being a writer; loves to tell stories above all else and is described as chunky with brown braids that stick out from behind her ears.

Tacy Kelly (Anna Anastacia Kelly)- Betsy's best friend based on Maud's friend Frances "Bick" Kenney. A very bashful child with a sensitive soul who loves listening to Betsy's stories and helps embellish a few. She has a spindly figure with long red ringlets.

Julia Ray- Betsy's older, somewhat bossy sister. While she's only three years older than Betsy, she considers herself quite grown-up, and feels free to lord that over the younger Betsy and Tacy. Has a pronounced interest in music that is developed much more extensively in later books.

Katie Kelly- Tacy's older, somewhat bossy sister. There are 11 children in the Kelly household in the opening of the book, and Katie is the fourth youngest. She and Julia are best friends.

Margaret Ray- a new baby born to the Rays during the course of the book. Betsy at first feels envious of the newcomer usurping the 'baby' spot, but after a talk with Tacy, realizes the fun of being an older sibling.

Beatrice Kelly- Tacy's baby sister, who dies shortly before Easter. Just as Tacy comforted Betsy in the gaining of a new sibling, Betsy comforts Tacy in the loss of a sibling.

Papa (Robert Ray) and Mama (Julia Warrington Ray)- Betsy's parents. Papa runs a shoe store, while Mama minds the home. Her parents aren't particularly well developed until later books.

Tom- a neighborhood boy who plays the violin and has a little crush on Tacy.

Tib Muller (Thelma Muller)- A little girl who moves into the neighborhood shortly before the end of the book. She's tiny and blond, and knows how to stand on her head. She lives in a chocolate-colored house with a pane of colored glass over the door. She meets Betsy and Tacy because they left Mrs. Ray's calling cards in the Muller's mailbox. Mrs. Muller returned the call, and the three girls eventually met. All become best friends in the two years in between the first book and the second.

== See also ==
- Betsy-Tacy Houses
