= Milwaukee-Downer Seminary =

Former private girls' school in Milwaukee, Wisconsin, USA

Coordinates: 43°04′37″N 87°52′43″W

Milwaukee-Downer Seminary was a non-sectarian private girls' elementary, junior high and high school in Milwaukee, Wisconsin. It was separated from Milwaukee-Downer College in 1910 (prior to that date it was the pre-collegiate section of the college); and added seventh and eighth grades in 1917, although a separate corporation was not obtained until 1933.

In 1959, MDS purchased land on Fairy Chasm Road in River Hills, Wisconsin and sold the Milwaukee campus to the University of Wisconsin–Milwaukee for $1.15 million. It opened its Fairy Chasm campus in 1961. MDS merged with the Milwaukee University School and Milwaukee Country Day School in 1963 to form the University School of Milwaukee. Buildings and land from its former campus still form part of the present-day campus of the University of Wisconsin–Milwaukee.

== In popular culture ==
A visit to a chum who is a day student at the seminary (rather lightly disguised as "Browner College" in Milwaukee) plays a prominent role in the novel Betsy in Spite of Herself, a 1946 book (set in 1907) in the Betsy-Tacy girl's book series by Maud Hart Lovelace.
