= Phebe Fairchild =

1936 children's novel by Lois Lenski

Phebe Fairchild: Her Book
- Author: Lois Lenski
- Illustrator: Lois Lenski
- Language: English
- Genre: Children's literature
- Publication date: 1936
- Publication place: United States
- Pages: 316

Phebe Fairchild: Her Book is a 1936 children's historical novel written and illustrated by Lois Lenski. The title character, a young girl, is sent to live with her puritan relatives while her parents sail to England. The novel was a Newbery Honor recipient in 1937, the first of Lenski's three recognitions (1942 and 1946). Anne T. Eaton's review in the New York Times called the book "a complete, well-rounded picture of life in an inland Connecticut village".
