= Betsy in Spite of Herself =

Book by Maud Hart Lovelace

- First edition
- Author: Maud Hart Lovelace
- Illustrator: Vera Neville
- Language: English
- Series: Betsy-Tacy
- Release number: 6
- Genre: Historical fiction
- Set in: Deep Valley, Minnesota (1907-1908)
- Publisher: Thomas Y. Crowell Co., HarperCollins
- Publication date: 1946
- Publication place: United States
- Media type: Print
- Pages: 272
- Preceded by: Heaven to Betsy (1945)
- Followed by: Betsy Was a Junior (1947)

Betsy in Spite of Herself (1946) is the sixth volume in the Betsy-Tacy series by Maud Hart Lovelace. The book, along with the entire Betsy-Tacy and Deep Valley series, was republished in 2000 by HarperTrophy with a new cover art illustrated by Michael Koelsch.

== Plot ==
The story covers Betsy and Tacy's sophomore, or tenth grade, year in high school and re-introduces the character of Tib Muller, now living in Milwaukee, Wisconsin.

During a visit to Tib's family in Milwaukee, Betsy decides to re-invent her image, changing the spelling of her name to Betsye and attempting to adopt characteristics that will make her seem mysterious and alluring. On her return to her hometown of Deep Valley, her new image helps her to attract a boyfriend whose good looks and automobile draw considerable attention in town. However, over time Betsy becomes dissatisfied with having to pretend continually to be a very different kind of person. She also finds that this behavior is not endearing her to friends or family nor helping her achieve her goals as a writer, so she ends the relationship. Despite the disappointment, she decides that the experience has been good for her by helping her to develop different aspects of herself.

A visit to a chum who is a day student at the "seminary" (high school) of Milwaukee-Downer College (rather lightly disguised as "Browner College" in Milwaukee) plays a prominent role in the novel.
