= Fay Foster =

American composer and teacher (1886–1960)

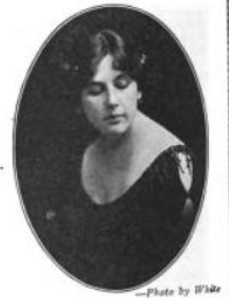

Fay Foster (November 8, 1886 – April 17, 1960) was an American pianist, composer, and teacher.

== Biography ==
Foster was born in Leavenworth, Kansas on November 8, 1886. She was a child prodigy, performing publicly by the age of 5, and professionally as organist and choir director by age 12. In Chicago she studied piano under William Hall Sherwood, voice under Mme Dove-Boitte, and theory with Frederick Grant Gleason. At the age of 17 she went on a national tour playing the piano for Sherwood's Grand Opera Company. Following her Chicago studies, at the age of 19, she was appointed director of the Grand Prairie Seminary's Conservatory of Music in Onarga, Illinois. In 1897 she opened a studio in Chicago's Steinway Hall to teach piano and theory.

In 1899 she travelled to Europe for twelve years, studying further under Heinrich Schwartz, Moritz Rosenthal, and Sofie Menter in Munich, and under Theodore Wiehmeyer, Alfred Reisenauer, and Salomon Jadassohn at the Leipzig Conservatory. She studied singing under Siga Garso, Hans Weinhoppel and Alexander Heinemann. She performed opera for two years in Italy.

In 1910, Berlin's Die Woche sponsored an international contest for a waltz modelled on the Blue Danube. Her waltz "The Prairie Flower" (originally titled "Sit Illi Terra Levis"), judged by a panel headed by Johann Strauss III, won second prize out of 4,222 submissions.

In early 1911 she returned to Kansas City to be with her sick father. Soon afterward she settled in New York City, establishing educational studios in Manhattan and in Hempstead. She divided her time between composing, teaching, and recital/accompanist work. She founded and directed the Foster Choral Club in Hempstead, Long Island. She taught voice at the American Institute of Applied Music. With two of her AIAM colleagues Josef Berge and Gene Gravelle, she founded the Foster Trio vocal ensemble. From 1923 to 1933 she taught at the Ogontz School in Rydall, Pennsylvania.

Foster was a prolific song composer. She won first place in the American Composers Competition in 1913. Her song "Are You For Me or Against Me?" won a prize in 1919 from the New York American, a competition with over 10,000 applicants. Foster was the only woman composer to win a prize.

Her song "The Americans Come (An Episode in France in the Year 1918)" was her most widely heard composition, having become part of the American post-WWI propaganda effort. George Harris Jr. and Margaret Romaine sang it on their tour in support of Liberty Loans, and Pathé contributed sales of its recording by Paul Althouse to the war bond effort. Reinald Werrenrath recorded it for RCA Victor. It had performances at New York Hippodrome by John McCormack, by Lotta Madden and several others at New York's Wanamaker's, by Yvonne de Tréville in Washington DC, and by Schumann-Heink and Theodore Van Yorx. In 1930 the song was turned into a short film by Alfred Mannon and Elmer Clifton featuring Otto Matieson.

She was a member of the Society of American Women Composers, Society of German Composers, the youngest admitted member of the Chicago Manuscript Society, the Authors' League of America, the Guild of Vocal Teachers, and the Musicians, No Name, Gamut, and MacDowell clubs of New York. She owned a summer home in Lavallette, New Jersey.

== Compositions ==
Below is a non-comprehensive list of Foster's compositions.

| Title | Instrumentation | Comment |
|---|---|---|
| Prairie flowers | Piano | Won the 1910 International Waltz Competition in Berlin |
| Etude de Concert | Piano | Won first prize in an Etude contest |
| Petite Valse de Ballet | Piano | |
| Sunset in a Japanese Garden | Piano | |
| Women's Choruses | Voice | |
| The Honorable Chop-Sticks | Voice | |
| The Shadow of the Bamboo Fence | Voice | Lyrics by Lafcadio Hearn |
| The Cruel Mother-in-Law | Voice | Lyrics by Lafcadio Hearn, dedicated to Anna Addison Moody. |
| The Red Heart | Voice | #1 of Two Japanese Sword Songs |
| A Nipponese Sword Song | Voice | #2 of Two Japanese Sword Songs |
| The Americans come: an episode in France in the year 1918 | Voice | Based on a poem by Elizabeth A. Wilbur published in Munsey's Magazine. |
| Dusk in June | Voice | |
| A Snow Song | Voice | |
| A Maiden | Voice | |
| Russian Doll | Voice | |
| In the carpenter shop | Voice | |
| Your kiss | Voice | Lyrics by Sara Teasdale |
| Sol' Down de Stream | Voice | Lyrics by Paul Lawrence Dunbar, dedicated to Foster's father |
| Con Amore | Voice | Lyrics by Ray Clarke Rose |
| My Journey's End | Voice | Lyrics by Florence Tarr (a student of Foster's) |
| Chains | Voice | |
| Don't Want to Know | Voice | |
| I Can Sing You a Song of Springtime | Voice | |
| Five Songs of Childhood | Voice | Lyrics by Ray Clark Rose. One of the songs is Fairy Castles |
| Karma | Voice | |
| Winter | Voice | Won 1st prize in New York's American song competition in 1914. Lyrics by I. Zangwill. |
| The King | Voice | Lyrics by Horatio Winslow |
| Sing a Song of Roses | Voice | |
| A Kiss in Colin's Eyes | Voice | Published by William A. Pond & Co |
| The Sheep in the Sky | Voice | Published by William A. Pond & Co |
| One Golden Day | Voice | |
| Der Maler | Voice | Lyrics by A. Glück, English translation by Allen Monroe Foster, dedicated to Oscar Seagle who premiered the song. |
| The Call of the Trail | Voice | Dedicated to Ethelynde Smith |
| The Daughter | Voice | |
| Spinning Wheel | Voice | Also a prize winner in New York's American song competition in 1914. Lyrics based on poetry of Alfred Perceval Graves. |
| Springtide of Love | Voice | Dedicated to Paul Althouse |
| In the Ilex Shadow | Voice | |
| If I Were the King of Ireland | Voice | |
| Peace, Ye Martyred Ones | Voice | |
| The Nightingales of Flanders | Voice | Lyrics by Grace Conkling |
| My Menagerie | Voice | Lyrics by Mrs. Elder from a poem found in The Youth's Companion. Dedicated to Louis Graveure. |
| O'er Bloomy Lands or Heather | Voice | |
| Secret Languages | Voice | Lyrics by Melville Chater. Dedicated to Kathleen Hart Bibb. |
| Swinging | Voice | |
| When Lovers Part | Voice | Lyrics by James. I. White |
| Love in Absence | Voice | |
| Louisiana Lullaby | Choral | |
| In the Carpenter's Shop | Choral | Published by Oliver Ditson Company. Won a prize given by the Women's Federation of Music Clubs. |
| A Little Boy's Dream | Choral | The Etude from this chorus won a Theodore Presser prize |
| The Moon Lady, Chinese theme | Opera | |
| The Castaways | Operetta | Libretto by Alice Monroe Foster |
| The Land of Chance | Operetta | Book and lyrics by Alice Monroe Foster |
| Blue Beard | Operetta | |
