= Margaret Covey Chisholm =

American painter (1909–1965)

- Born: Margaret Sale Covey; July 6, 1909; Englewood, New Jersey
- Died: 1965
- Other names: Margaret Sale Covey, Mrs Chisholm
- Occupations: artist, muralist, portrait painter

Margaret Sale Covey Chisholm (July 6, 1909 – January 24, 1965) was an American portrait painter and muralist who painted the mural for the Livingston, Tennessee, post office as part of the WPA artist project during the Great Depression. Her works are held in numerous public and private collections.

== Early years ==
Margaret Sale Covey was born on July 6, 1909, in Englewood, New Jersey, to muralist Arthur Covey and Mary Dorothea Sale. Her stepmother was award-winning children's author and illustrator Lois Lenski. She was a student at the Art Students League in New York City and later studied at the Pennsylvania Academy of the Fine Arts under the tutelage of N. C. Wyeth. After a year studying art at the School of Fine Arts (French: École des Beaux-Arts) in Fontainebleau, France, she went on to study and graduate with a degree in fine art from Yale University. Her teachers included Anne Goldthwaite and Leon Kroll.

== Work ==
Covey was commissioned by the Federal Art Project to paint a mural, The Newcomers, for the post office in Livingston, Tennessee, which she did in 1940. She also painted a mural at the Ferncliff Mausoleum in Hartsdale, Westchester County, New York. She exhibited in solo shows from Connecticut to Washington, D.C., and won awards from the New Rochelle Art Association, the Westchester Art Society and the Westchester Arts and Crafts Guild. In addition to working as an artist, she taught at the Rehabilitation Center in Fort Slocum.

She later married Robert K. Chisholm, an architect, and made her home in Pleasantville, New York, where she gave art classes at her home and at the Pleasantville High School for adult education classes Her "work is in many public and private collections."
