= Betsy-Tacy and Tib =

- First edition
- Author: Maud Hart Lovelace
- Illustrator: Lois Lenski
- Language: English
- Series: Betsy-Tacy
- Release number: 2
- Genre: Children's fiction
- Set in: Deep Valley, Minnesota (1900)
- Publisher: Thomas Y. Crowell Co., HarperCollins
- Publication date: 1941
- Publication place: United States
- Media type: Print
- Pages: 127
- ISBN: 0-06-024416-X
- Dewey Decimal: 813.52
- LC Class: PZ7.L9561
- Preceded by: Betsy-Tacy (1940)
- Followed by: Betsy and Tacy Go Over the Big Hill (1942)

Betsy-Tacy and Tib (1941) is the second volume in the Betsy-Tacy series by Maud Hart Lovelace. The book, along with the entire Betsy-Tacy and Deep Valley series, was republished in 2000 by HarperTrophy with a new cover art illustrated by Michael Koelsch.

== Plot ==
Betsy, Tacy, and Tib are three eight-year-old girls who live in Deep Valley, Minnesota. At a carnival, they are mesmerized by the Flying Lady. When they learn that her act used a see-saw, they put on a show for their neighbors, recreating the act with a see-saw they assemble themselves. The three girls and Tib's brother Freddie build a playhouse in Tib's basement, using her family's store of firewood. Tib's father convinces them to demolish the playhouse by reenacting the fable of The Three Little Pigs with the little girls as the pigs and Freddie as the wolf.

When Betsy's mother allows Betsy, Tacy, and Tib to stay at the house by themselves, they amuse themselves by cooking a dish Betsy calls Everything. They put a little of every ingredient in the kitchen into the pot. After tasting the results, they toss it out, but that night, all three have stomach-aches. Betsy, Tacy, and Tib explore Tib's house by looking into mirrors, calling the rooms that they see in the mirrors part of the Mirror Palace.

After Tacy recovers from a bout of diphtheria, the girls decide to cut off locks of their hair so they each have a keepsake of the others. They cut off one of Betsy's braids, half of Tacy's long red ringlets, and half of Tib's yellow curls, and divide the hair into pillboxes that they can each wear as lockets. Their parents are furious until they hear the girls' reasoning which makes them laugh. Tib's mother cuts of the rest of the girls' hair to even it up.

Annoyed that their older sisters created a club that they were left out of, Betsy, Tacy, and Tib form The Christian Kindness Club. The club is supposed to encourage good behavior by punishing bad behavior. The girls end up competing to do more bad behavior than the others.
