= Betsy's Wedding (novel) =

1955 novel by Maud Hart Lovelace

- First edition
- Author: Maud Hart Lovelace
- Illustrator: Vera Neville
- Language: English
- Series: Betsy-Tacy
- Release number: 10
- Genre: Historical fiction
- Set in: Minneapolis, Minnesota (1917)
- Publisher: Thomas Y. Crowell Co., HarperCollins
- Publication date: 1955
- Publication place: United States
- Media type: Print
- Pages: 241
- ISBN: 0-06-440544-3
- Preceded by: Betsy and the Great World (1952)

Betsy's Wedding (1955) is the tenth and final book in the Betsy-Tacy series written by Maud Hart Lovelace. Set in Minneapolis, Minnesota, the book tells the story of the early married life of the main character, Betsy Ray, and her high-school sweetheart, Joe. The characters of Tacy Kelly and Tib Muller also recur in this novel, as they did in all the novels covering the high-school years. The book, along with the entire Betsy-Tacy and Deep Valley series, was republished in 2000 by HarperTrophy with a new cover art illustrated by Michael Koelsch.

== Plot summary ==
Betsy returns to New York from her European trip, where Joe Willard is waiting for her. He wants to buy her an engagement ring at Tiffany's, but the more practical Betsy suggests buying a wedding band instead. They spend the day in New York City enjoying many of Joe's favorite places, but more importantly renewing their love.

Betsy takes a train to Minneapolis, where her parents and younger sister are living. She breaks the news of her engagement to her family, who are surprised Joe wants to marry Betsy without first asking her father and without having a job in Minnesota. Her father is upset and thinks Joe should have a job so he can support himself and Betsy. When Joe arrives at the train station, Betsy tells him how her father felt; Joe drives from newspaper office to newspaper office before finding a job on a publicity campaign to help Belgians (victims of World War I atrocities). Betsy's father respects Joe's go-getter attitude and allows the wedding to proceed. Joe and Betsy live with her parents while looking for an apartment; with younger sister Margaret's help, they find the perfect place. Betsy struggles with her first forays into cooking, but gradually improves and learns how to make some of Joe's favorites.

Several months later, Joe's widowed aunt asks if she can live with them. Joe says yes, although Betsy resents his decision. Joe is aware of Betsy's feelings (she had hoped to bring a baby into their happy home, not Joe's aunt) and this was their first serious difference of opinion. Betsy cannot help feeling bitter until she realizes Joe's generosity is one of the things she loves about him. In the end, she enjoys Joe's aunt's company and her wonderful stories, especially when Joe begins working the night shift writing newspaper headlines.

Meanwhile, Betsy and Tacy try to find a husband for Tib. They introduce her to Mr. Bagshaw (a colleague of Harry's), who quickly falls in love with Tib. He proposes, but Tib turns him down. Betsy and Tacy are relieved, having realized that if Tib had married Bagshaw, she would have moved to New York. Betsy then introduces Tib to Rocky, a "Tramp" journalist they meet at "The Violent Study Club" (a group of friends and fellow writers with whom Betsy and Joe hone their writing skills). But Rocky treats Tib horribly, even ridiculing her in front of friends. Finally, Tib ends the relationship and Rocky leaves. Eventually Tib meets a kind, handsome soldier while ice skating and they fall in love.

As the book ends, America enters World War I and Joe goes to a nearby officer's training camp. He and Betsy rent out their house and Betsy returns to her parents' home for the duration of the war. Before Joe leaves, they attend Tib's wedding in Deep Valley with family members and old friends.
