= Betsy and the Great World =

Book by Maud Hart Lovelace

- First edition
- Author: Maud Hart Lovelace
- Illustrator: Vera Neville
- Language: English
- Series: Betsy-Tacy
- Release number: 9
- Genre: Historical fiction
- Set in: Europe (1914)
- Publisher: Thomas Y. Crowell Co., HarperCollins
- Publication date: 1952
- Publication place: United States
- Media type: Print
- Pages: 305
- ISBN: 0-06-440545-1
- Preceded by: Betsy and Joe (1948)
- Followed by: Betsy's Wedding (1955)

Betsy and the Great World (1952) is the ninth volume in the Betsy-Tacy series of children's fiction by Maud Hart Lovelace. The book, along with the entire Betsy-Tacy and Deep Valley series, was republished in 2000 by HarperTrophy with a new cover art illustrated by Michael Koelsch.

The novel is set in 1914 and focuses on the newly adult Betsy Ray's adventures while spending a year traveling through Europe in place of attending college. The novel is based on the journals of the author's own trip to Europe during 1914. The novel discusses the buildup of troops in Germany prior to World War I, and also includes an account of England's declaration of war.

== Places visited by Betsy Ray in the novel ==
- The Azores (boat excursion)
- Madeira (boat excursion)
- Gibraltar (boat excursion)
- Algiers (boat excursion)
- Genoa (briefly: goes ashore and hops on train)
- Munich (extended stay)
- Sonneberg
- Bayreuth
- Oberammergau
- Venice (extended stay)
- Lucerne
- Paris
- London (extended stay)
