= Betsy Was a Junior =

Book by Maud Hart Lovelace

- First edition
- Author: Maud Hart Lovelace
- Illustrator: Vera Neville
- Language: English
- Series: Betsy-Tacy
- Release number: 7
- Genre: Historical fiction
- Set in: Deep Valley, Minnesota (1908-1909)
- Publisher: Thomas Y. Crowell Co., HarperCollins
- Publication date: 1947
- Publication place: United States
- Media type: Print
- Pages: 248
- ISBN: 0-06-440547-8
- Preceded by: Betsy in Spite of Herself (1946)
- Followed by: Betsy and Joe (1948)

Betsy Was a Junior (1947) is the seventh volume in the Betsy-Tacy series by Maud Hart Lovelace. The story spans the title character's junior, or eleventh grade, year in high school. The book, along with the entire Betsy-Tacy and Deep Valley series, was republished in 2000 by HarperTrophy with a new cover art illustrated by Michael Koelsch.

== Plot summary ==
The novel begins with the return of Betsy's childhood friend Thelma (Tib) Muller, who had been living in Milwaukee, Wisconsin since her parents were independent and they wanted to return to their old life, and the departure of Betsy's older sister, Julia, for college at the University of Minnesota. Julia's desire to bypass college and begin a musical career cause her to be relatively uninterested in classes and to focus instead on her desire to join a sorority. Excited by her sister's stories of college life, Betsy and her friends Tacy and Tib join with five other girls in establishing a local sorority at the high school level.

Over time, Betsy finds that the social whirl of the sorority distracts her from her studies and also eventually causes a backlash of resentment among the rest of the student body, which leads to her group's being excluded from their usual leading role in school activities. Moreover, the exclusiveness of the sorority concept pushes away others she would like to welcome into her social circle. Julia likewise becomes less interested in sororities after she is temporarily blackballed for having attracted the romantic attentions of a man who had dated other sorority members. By April, both girls have decided against sorority membership — Betsy in order to have a wider circle of friends and Julia to have the long-awaited chance to travel abroad and begin her musical training in earnest.

The novel also revisits a theme from the previous novel in the series, Betsy in Spite of Herself. Having been reunited with her old friends Betsy and Tacy, and re-entering a co-educational setting after years in a girls-only school, Tib is initially very interested in her friends' advice on attracting young men by seeming less practical and knowledgeable than she really is. However, at various points in the novel the narrator portrays this dumbing-down as a silly and unnecessary self-denial that is not very satisfying.
