= Betsy-Tacy =

Novel series by Maud Hart Lovelace

- Betsy-Tacy; Betsy-Tacy and Tib; Betsy and Tacy Go Over the Big Hill; Betsy and Tacy Go Downtown; Heaven to Betsy; Betsy in Spite of Herself; Betsy Was a Junior; Betsy and Joe; Betsy and the Great World; Betsy's Wedding
- Author: Maud Hart Lovelace
- Illustrator: Lois Lenski (books 1–4); Vera Neville (books 5–10)
- Country: United States
- Language: English
- Genre: Children's fiction; Historical fiction
- Publisher: Thomas Y. Crowell Co.; HarperCollins
- Published: 1940–1955
- Media type: Print
- No. of books: 10

The Betsy-Tacy books are a series of semi-autobiographical novels by American novelist and short-story writer Maud Hart Lovelace (1892–1980), which were originally published between 1940 and 1955 by the Thomas Y. Crowell Co. The books are now published by HarperCollins. The first four books were illustrated by Lois Lenski and the remainder by Vera Neville.

The series follows the adventures of heroine Betsy Ray, who is based closely on the author, and her friends and family. The first book, Betsy-Tacy, begins in 1897 on the eve of Betsy's fifth birthday, and the last book, Betsy's Wedding, ends in 1917 as the United States prepares to enter the First World War.

== History ==
The series was inspired by the bedtime stories which Lovelace told to her daughter Merian about her own childhood. The popularity of Betsy-Tacy, published in 1940, led her to write three more books, Betsy-Tacy and Tib (1941), Betsy and Tacy Go Over the Big Hill (1942), and Betsy and Tacy Go Downtown (1943). Although Lovelace intended to end the series after four books, her husband and daughter, who had found her high-school diaries, insisted that she use them to extend it through Betsy's high school career. This led to Heaven to Betsy (1945), Betsy in Spite of Herself (1946), Betsy was a Junior (1947), and Betsy and Joe (1948), each of which covers one high school year. Lovelace described these books, for which she drew heavily on her diaries and high-school scrapbooks, as particularly true to life. She wrote in 1964 that "the family life, customs, jokes, traditions are all true and the general pattern of the years is also accurate."

The first eight books are set in the fictional town of Deep Valley, Minnesota, based on Lovelace's childhood home of Mankato. After completing Betsy and Joe Lovelace wrote the first two of her three "Deep Valley Books," Carney's House Party (1949) and Emily of Deep Valley (1950), in which Betsy Ray and other characters from the Betsy-Tacy series appear, before returning to Betsy's story. The final books in the series, Betsy and the Great World (1952) and Betsy's Wedding (1955), follow Betsy through a European sojourn and her first years of married life in Minneapolis. They are also based closely on Lovelace's personal experiences.

When HarperTrophy reprinted the Betsy-Tacy and Deep Valley series in 2000, they commissioned Michael Koelsch to illustrate new cover artworks for all thirteen books.

== The books ==
The Betsy-Tacy books, like other series such as the Harry Potter and Little House books, are written at progressively more difficult reading levels as the characters age and encounter more complex situations. The first books are written for children, while those at the end of the series are written for ages 14 and up.

=== The Betsy-Tacy series ===
- Betsy-Tacy (1940)
- Betsy-Tacy and Tib (1941)
- Betsy and Tacy Go Over the Big Hill (1942)
- Betsy and Tacy Go Downtown (1943)
- Heaven to Betsy (1945)
- Betsy in Spite of Herself (1946)
- Betsy Was a Junior (1947)
- Betsy and Joe (1948)
- Betsy and the Great World (1952)
- Betsy's Wedding (1955)

=== The Deep Valley books ===
- Carney's House Party (1949)
- Emily of Deep Valley (1950)
- Winona's Pony Cart (1953)

== Characters and setting ==
Although the books are fiction, their characters are based closely on Lovelace's own family and friends. Many characters can be matched with individuals, while others are composites drawn from incidents in the lives of several people.

- Betsy Warrington Ray, the protagonist of the series, is based on Maud Palmer Hart (Lovelace). Betsy is sociable, fun-loving and highly imaginative; the early books feature the stories she makes up and tells to her friends. Her ultimately successful quest to become a published author and the challenges she faces in learning to balance her commitment to her writing against other, usually social concerns are themes throughout the series.
- The members of the Ray family are based on the Hart family. Bob Ray, Betsy's father, is based on Thomas Hart, Maud's father; like Thomas Hart, Bob Ray owned a shoe store and made onion sandwiches for family and friends on Sunday evenings. Jule Ray, Betsy's mother, is based on Stella Hart, Maud's mother, who was also red-haired, vivacious, and able to play two songs on the piano, one waltz and one two-step. Betsy's musical, coquettish older sister Julia Ray was based on Maud's older sister Kathleen Hart who, like Julia, studied music in Europe and became an opera singer. Her younger sister Margaret Ray was based on Maud's younger sister, Helen Hart.
- Anastacia "Tacy" Kelly, Betsy's closest friend, is based on Lovelace's lifelong friend Frances "Bick" Kenney. Tacy is shy, sensitive, and fun-loving, from a large Irish family who live across the street from the Rays.
- Thelma "Tib" Muller, the third member of the trio of Betsy, Tacy and Tib, is based on Marjorie "Midge" Gerlach. Tib is fearless and competent; she is also petite, blonde, and learns to be very flirtatious. Tib and her family move back and forth between the Anglo-American atmosphere of Deep Valley and the German-American community of Milwaukee, Wisconsin. She is bilingual and able to navigate the varied social expectations of the contexts through which she moves.
- Joe Willard, Betsy's husband, is based on Maud Hart Lovelace's husband, journalist and novelist Delos Wheeler Lovelace. Maud Hart and Delos Lovelace met in 1917, when she was twenty-five. However, she chose to include a character based on her husband in the books beginning with Heaven to Betsy. She used his descriptions of his boyhood to provide Joe's high school experiences and back story. Joe is an orphan, ambitious, self-sufficient and hard-working. Over the course of the four high school books his relationship with Betsy develops from a friendly rivalry to romance.
- The Crowd, Betsy's large group of friends, are based on Maud Hart Lovelace's own friends. Some characters were one-to-one matches with individuals while others were composites. In some cases, such as Crowd members Carney (Marion Willard) and Cab (Jabez Lloyd), their portrayals were based on lifelong friendships.

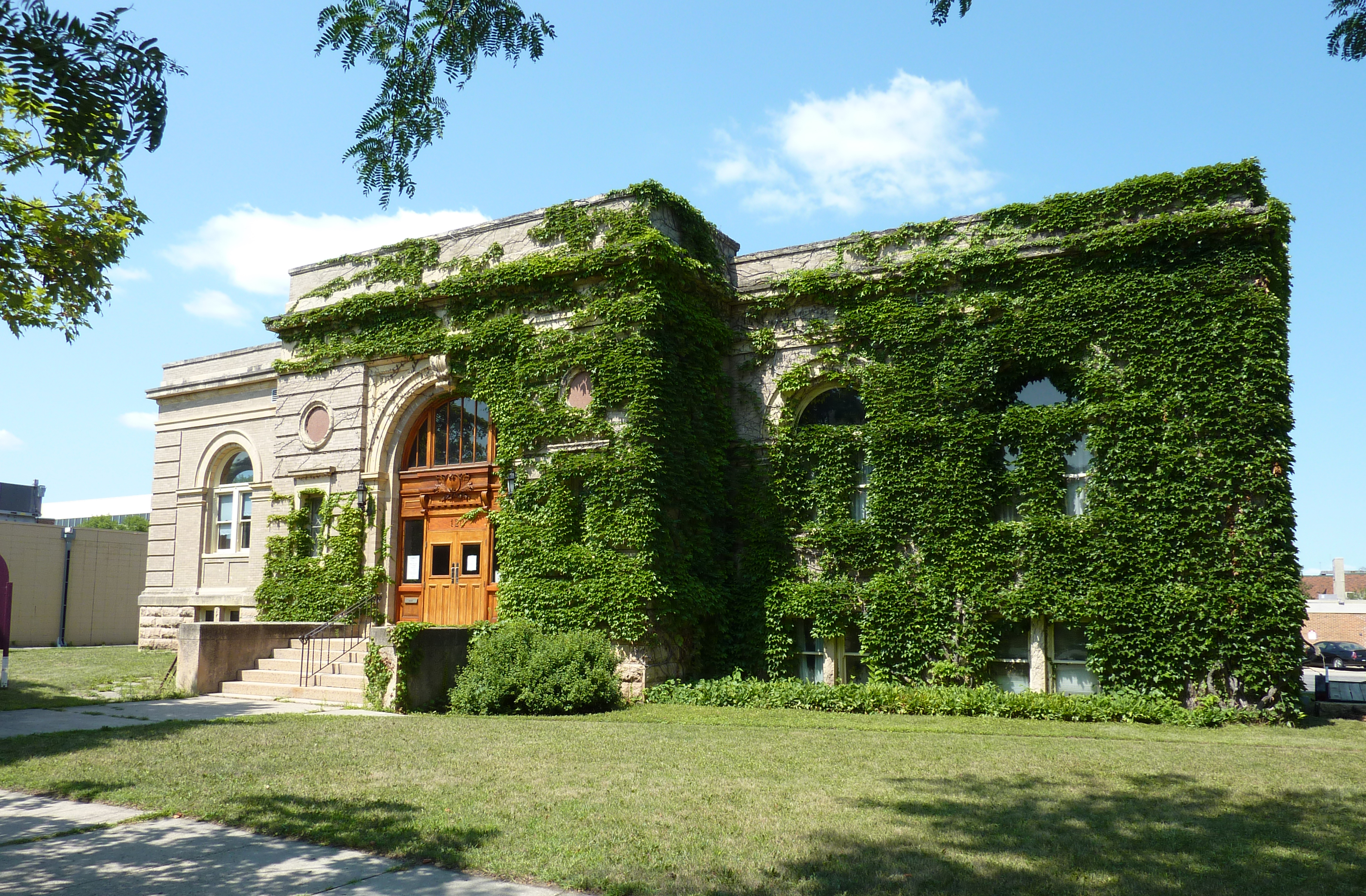
Mankato's Carnegie Library. Betsy visits its Deep Valley equivalent for the first time in Betsy and Tacy Go Downtown.

The settings reflect extensive research done by Lovelace and, for the first four books, illustrator Lois Lenski, as well as Lovelace's memories. Most of the novels take place in and around the fictional town of Deep Valley, Minnesota, which is based on the author's actual hometown of Mankato, Minnesota. The Ray family and other characters inhabit the houses of their real-life counterparts. Lovelace transformed the neighborhood of 332 and 333 Center Street, her own childhood home and that of Bick Kenney, into the fictional Hill Street, named after the adjoining Big Hill. As Betsy grows older, her horizons expand to include more of the town. Betsy and Tacy Go Downtown introduces the Carnegie Library and downtown Deep Valley with its shops and Opera House. The high school books bring in the surrounding countryside.

Lovelace utilized her own diaries and scrapbooks, contemporary materials such as magazines and catalogs, and correspondence with old friends and other past and present residents of Mankato who provided information to fill out her narratives. "I could make it all up," she wrote, "but in these Betsy-Tacy stories, I love to work from real incidents." Even scenes which are clearly invented share this attention to detail. For example, Betsy in Spite of Herself, in which Betsy visits her friend Tib and her family in Milwaukee, includes a scene where Betsy and the Mullers spend Christmas Eve at the home of Tib's Grosspapa Muller. There was no real-life Grosspapa Muller, Midge Gerlach's paternal grandfather having died before this 1907 visit, and much of the description of Christmas in a wealthy German household was taken from letters written by Kathleen Hart while she was studying in Germany. Another detail, the cast-iron dwarves with which Grosspapa decorated his lawn during the summer, may have come from a then-recent source, novelist Edna Ferber's 1940 memoir A Peculiar Treasure, which states that when Ferber worked as a reporter in Milwaukee during 1906–09, the city's wealthy families decorated their lawns with painted dwarves.

== Themes ==
Lovelace explores several long-range themes that achieve a cumulative effect in the series.

=== Maturation ===
Lovelace shows Betsy's growing independence and responsibility as the character ages through the books. The character herself draws attention to her own changes, recalling how homesick she was during her stay with a farm family (Heaven to Betsy) when she later enjoys a long visit with a different family (Betsy and Joe). Betsy learns from her mistakes throughout the books; each year she makes new mistakes, but not similar ones.

=== Friendship ===
There is an emphasis on friendship in the series. Lovelace shows long-lasting friendships that survive all the various changes the characters experiences as they age. The girls do not quarrel or compete with each other. In the later books, as the characters enter high school, the girls expand their circles of friends without losing their special relationships.

=== Internationalism ===
Written during World War II and the years following the war, Lovelace adds positive views of other cultures in the series. In Betsy and Tacy Go Over the Big Hill, the characters discover a neighborhood of Syrian immigrants and make friends with them. In Betsy In Spite of Herself, Betsy's visit to Tib in Milwaukee introduces the culture of German immigrants. Lovelace establishes that many of the immigrants from Germany were fleeing its growing militarism. When Betsy visits Munich (Betsy and the Great World), the character gains a deeper appreciation of the German culture, despite class barriers and militarism that she finds disturbing.

=== Integrity ===
Betsy explores being true to herself throughout the high school books. After years of happily writing her stories, Betsy abandons her ambition when it conflicts with her new friendships, only to realize that writing is an essential part of her life (Heaven to Betsy). Her experiments with changing her behavior and appearance in Betsy in Spite of Herself lead her to realize that she is devaluing who she is by pretending to be someone that she is not.

== Reception ==
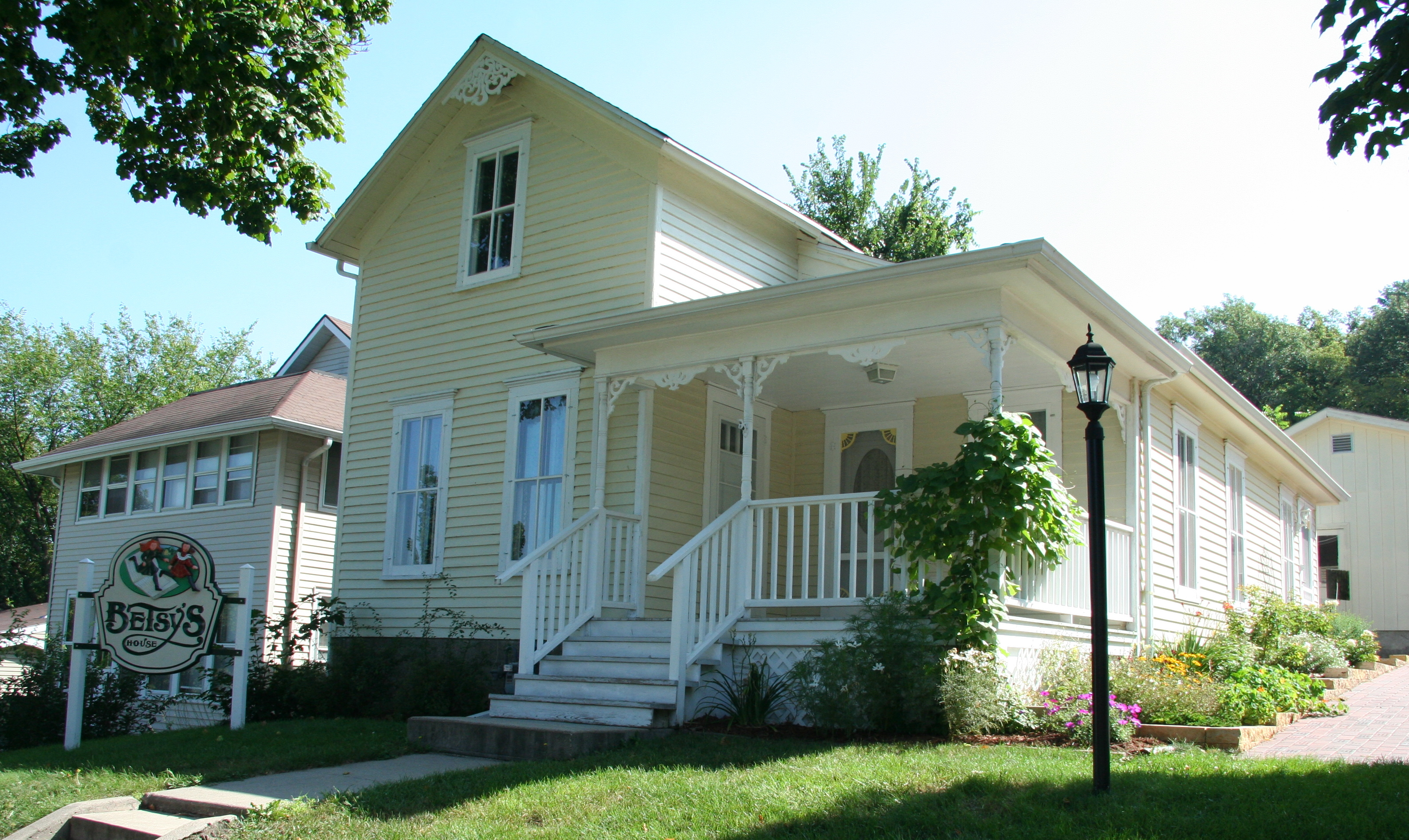
"Betsy's House," 333 Center Street, Mankato

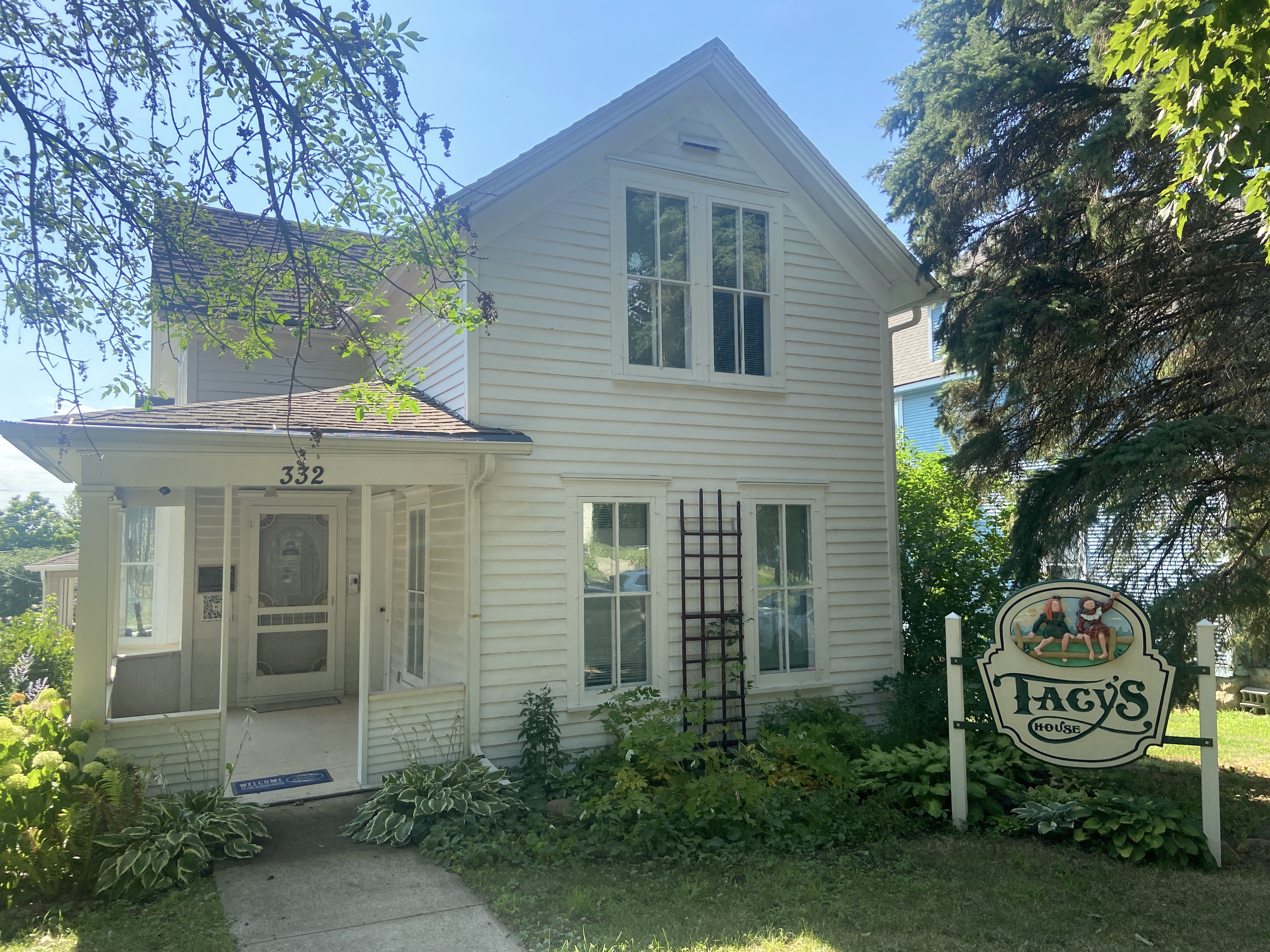
Tacy's House

The Betsy-Tacy books were well-received, with the first edition of Betsy-Tacy going through more than thirty printings after initial publication. In the 1970s a paperback edition of the first six books in the series was published. However, during the 1980s, the books went out of print.

In 1990, a group of adult fans of the series established the Betsy-Tacy Society in Mankato. The Society undertook a letter-writing campaign that convinced HarperCollins to bring the first four books back into print by 1992. Ultimately new editions of all ten Betsy-Tacy books and the three Deep Valley books were published, and as of 2016 all of the books remain available.

The series had a cameo role in the 1998 film You've Got Mail, in which bookstore owner Kathleen Kelly (Meg Ryan) describes the first two books of the series to young Annabel Fox (Hallee Hirsh), who immediately decides she wants them all.

The Betsy-Tacy Society bought and restored the childhood homes of Maud Hart ("Betsy's House") and Bick Kenney ("Tacy's House"), and operates them as a museum. In 2010, the Association of Library Trustees, Advocates, Friends and Foundations designated the site a Literary Landmark. The Minnesota History Center has included Maud Hart Lovelace as one of the characters in its "History Players" interpretive series, with a presentation focusing on her childhood and path to a literary career.
