= Delos W. Lovelace =

American novelist

Delos Wheeler Lovelace
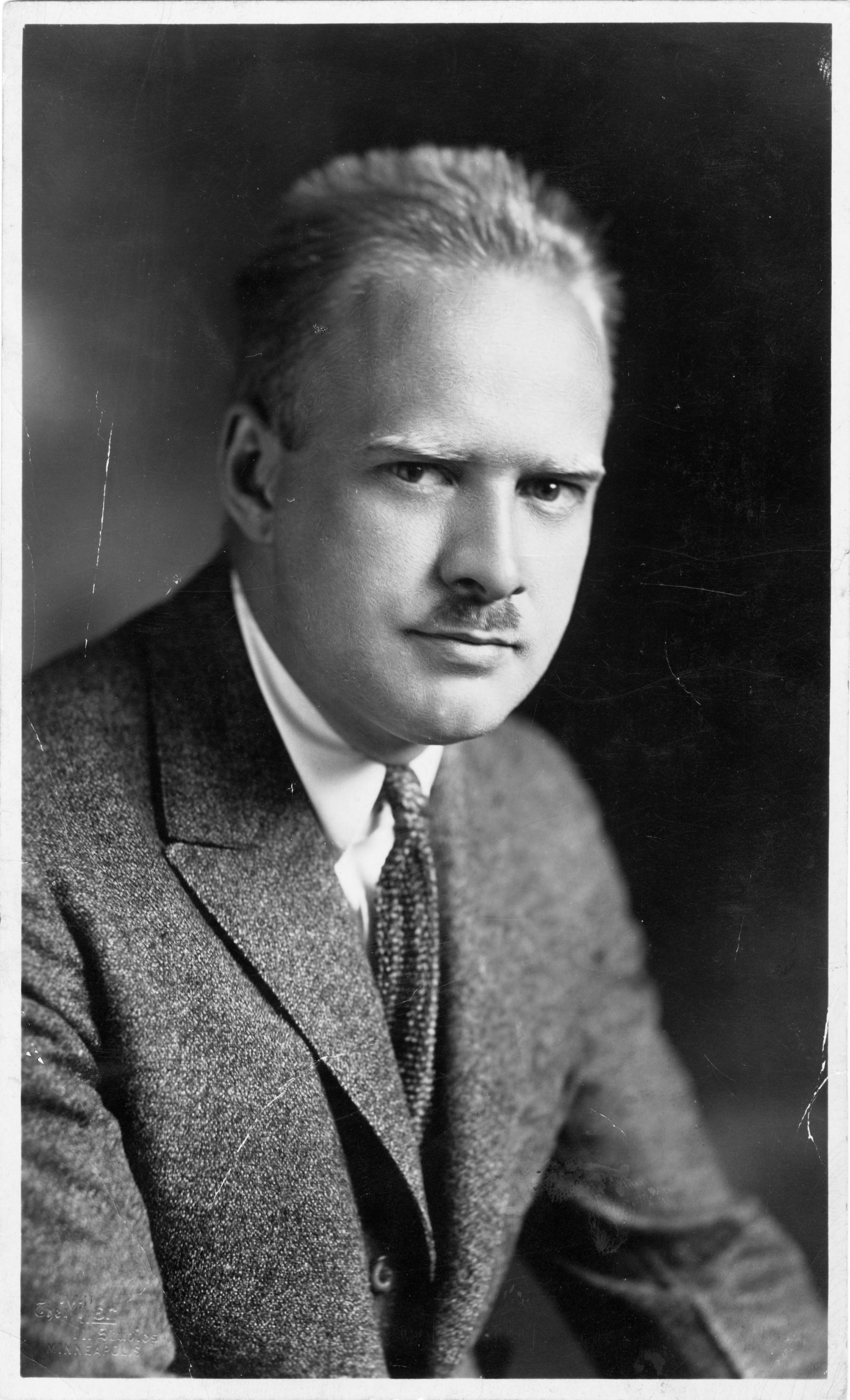
- Born: December 2, 1894; Brainerd, Minnesota, United States
- Died: 17 January 1967 (aged 72)
- Occupation: Novelist
- Spouse: Maud Hart Lovelace
- Children: Merian Lovelace

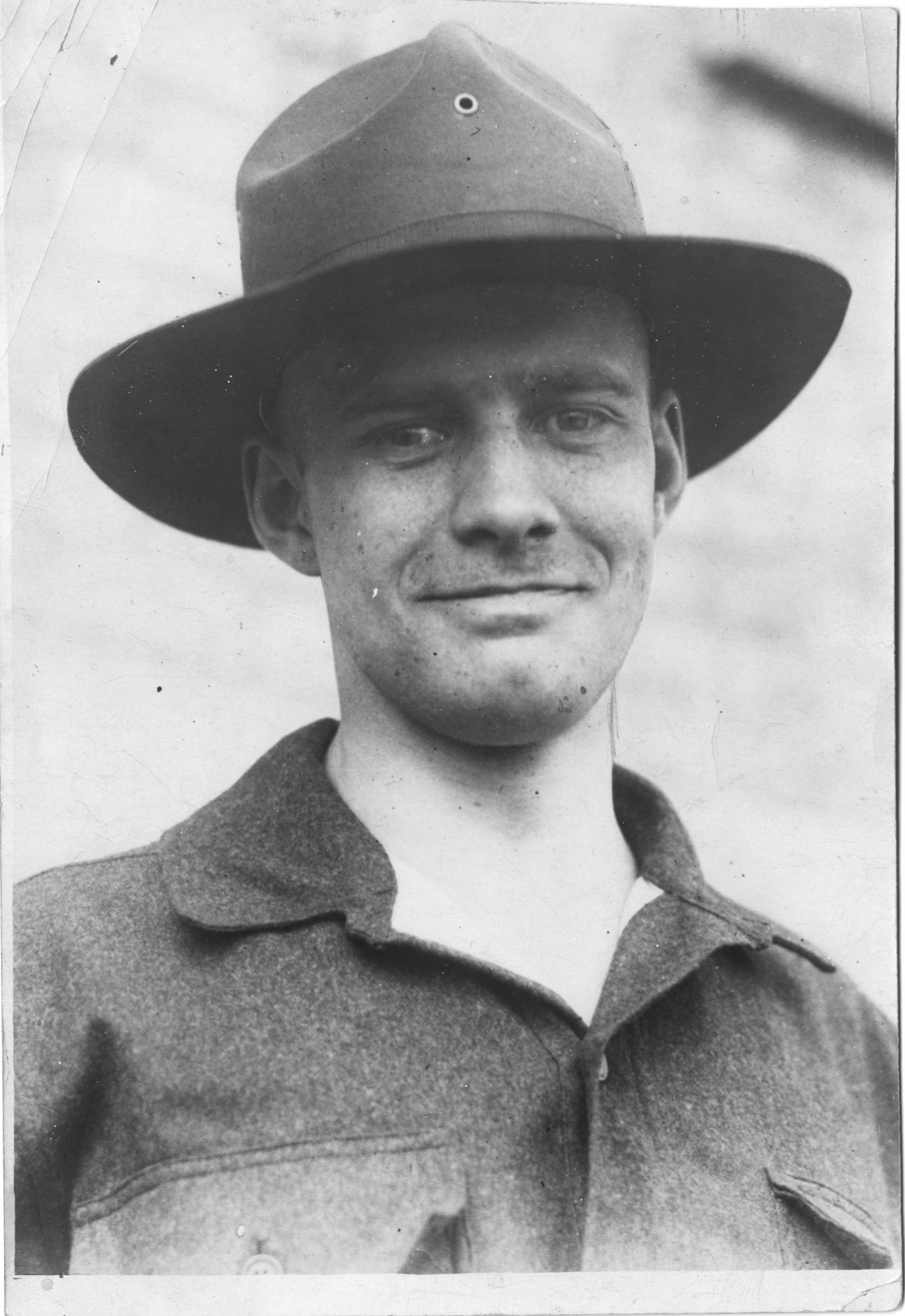
Lovelace in 1917

Delos Wheeler Lovelace (December 2, 1894 – January 17, 1967) was an American novelist who authored the original novelization of the film King Kong (1933) published in 1932 by Grosset & Dunlap, slightly before the film was released. The story was also serialized in 2 parts in February and March 1933 by Walter Ripperger (credited to Edgar Wallace) for Mystery magazine. Lovelace was a reporter for the New York Daily News and The Sun in the 1920s.

He authored some two dozen books, including a biography of football coach Knute Rockne and one of Dwight D. Eisenhower. He co-authored three books with his wife.

== Personal life ==
He was the husband of Maud Hart Lovelace, author of the Betsy-Tacy books for young readers; they had one daughter, Merian (January 18, 1931 — September 25, 1997).

== Bibliography ==
- Rear Admiral Byrd and the Polar Expedition (1930; published under the pen-name Coram Foster)
- Rockne of Notre Dame (1931; biography of Knute Rockne)
- King Kong (1933; novelization of the 1933 film King Kong)
- One Stayed at Welcome (1934; co-authored with wife Maud Hart Lovelace)
- Gentlemen from England (1937; co-authored with wife Maud Hart Lovelace)
- The golden wedge: Indian legends of South America (1942; co-authored with wife Maud Hart Lovelace)
- General "Ike" Eisenhower (1944; biography of Dwight D. Eisenhower)
- Journey to Bethlehem (1953)
- That Dodger Horse (1956; sometimes "The Dodger Horse")

Short stories:

- "Auction" (with Maud Hart Lovelace), (ss) The Country Gentleman Aug 2 1924
- "Barley Straw", The Country Gentleman Aug 23 1924
- "Big Bite", The Country Gentleman Feb 1926
- "Bonanza", The Country Gentleman Jul 1926
- "Boot", The Country Gentleman May 2, 1925
- "Borghild’s Clothes" (with Maud Hart Lovelace), The Modern Priscilla Apr 1922
- "Carmelita, Widow" (with Maud Hart Lovelace), Catholic World Oct 1924
- "Country Fair", The Country Gentleman May 1926
- "Country Queer", The Country Gentleman May 2, 1925
- "Cutting Edge", The Country Gentleman Apr 11 1925
- "Danny", The Country Gentleman Jul 11 1925
- "Detour No. 1", The Country Gentleman Mar 1928
- "Dishpan", The Country Gentleman Sep 1927
- "East Wind" (with Maud Hart Lovelace), The Country Gentleman Apr 26 1924
- "Fiddlefoot", The Saturday Evening Post Jul 18 1925
- "Fussbudget", The American Magazine Feb 1928
- "Gimme Gal", Success Jul 1927
- "Good Ideal", The Country Gentleman Aug 22 1925
- "Good Provider", The Country Gentleman May 1929
- "Inheritance", The Country Gentleman Dec 20 1924
- "Kitchen View", The Country Gentleman May 1927
- "Land" (with Maud Hart Lovelace), Liberty Aug 9 1924
- "Laughing Tyrant" (with Maud Hart Lovelace), The Country Gentleman Mar 29 1924
- "Little of Both, A", The Popular Magazine Sep 20 1925
- "Lucky Year", The Country Gentleman Feb 7 1925
- "Maid and the Hope Chest, The" (with Maud Hart Lovelace), Metropolitan Magazine May 1924
- "Neighbors" (with Maud Hart Lovelace), The Country Gentleman Sep 27 1924
- "Old Chris Pedersen", The Country Gentleman Dec 1925
- "One Day to Live" (with Maud Hart Lovelace), The Delineator Oct 1925
- "Proud Old Rooster", The American Magazine Mar 1928
- "Pull-Away", The Country Gentleman Mar 28 1925
- "Sleeping Cold", The Saturday Evening Post Feb 25 1928
- "Sold", The Country Gentleman Aug 1 1925
- "Stubborn Stebbins", The Country Gentleman Nov 1928
- "Swap", The Country Gentleman May 23, 1925
- "Toe of the Stocking", The Country Gentleman Dec 1926
- "Venture", Liberty May 1, 1926
- "Wheat", Ladies Home Journal Jul 1924
- "Whip Hand", The Country Gentleman Jun 13 1925
- "Yes, Ma’am!", The Country Gentleman May 1928
