= Heaven to Betsy =

Book by Maud Hart Lovelace

- First edition
- Author: Maud Hart Lovelace
- Illustrator: Vera Neville
- Language: English
- Series: Betsy-Tacy
- Release number: 5
- Genre: Historical fiction
- Set in: Deep Valley, Minnesota (1906-1907)
- Publisher: Thomas Y. Crowell Co., HarperCollins
- Publication date: 1945
- Publication place: United States
- Media type: Print
- Pages: 268
- Preceded by: Betsy and Tacy Go Downtown (1943)
- Followed by: Betsy in Spite of Herself (1946)

Heaven to Betsy (1945) is the fifth volume in the Betsy-Tacy series by Maud Hart Lovelace. Heaven to Betsy, describing Betsy's first year in high school, is written for an older age group than the earlier Betsy-Tacy books.

== Background ==
The events of the novel span Betsy and Tacy's freshman, or ninth-grade, year of school. A major character is added to the series' cast when Betsy meets Joe Willard, an orphan working for his aunt and uncle in their store at Butternut Center. The story differs from the first four books, by expanding the Betsy-Tacy-Tib circle to "The Crowd," a group of boys and girls that frequently meet at Betsy's house. Although Joe Willard was based on Maud Hart Lovelace's husband, Delos Lovelace, the book concentrates more on Betsy's adventures with the Crowd, including her self-described first love, Tony Markham, and the effect of the Crowd on Betsy's burgeoning talent for writing.

== Editions ==
- Heaven to Betsy. Thomas Y. Crowell Co., 1945.
- Heaven to Betsy. Thomas Y. Crowell Co., 1966. ISBN 9780690138054
- Heaven to Betsy. HarperTrophy, 1980. ISBN 9780064401104
- Heaven to Betsy/Betsy in Spite of Herself. William Morrow Paperbacks, 2009. ISBN 978-0061794698
