= Robert Ringer =

American motivational speaker

- Born: 1938 (age 87–88)
- Occupation: Author
- Notable work: Winning Through Intimidation, Looking Out for #1, Restoring the American Dream
- Movement: Objectivism, libertarianism

Robert J. Ringer (born 1938) is an American entrepreneur, motivational and political speaker, and author of several best-selling personal-development and political books.

== Career ==
His first book, Winning Through Intimidation, was published in 1973. After the manuscript racked up 23 rejections from publishers, Ringer decided to self-publish the book. It became a #1 bestseller, spending 36 weeks at the top of The New York Times Best Seller list. In 2002, Ringer revised and updated it and republished it with a new title: To Be or Not to Be Intimidated?: That is the Question. He says that the change was made to clarify his aim in the books—not to turn people into intimidators, but to give them the tools to keep others from intimidating them.

Ringer also self-published his second book, Looking Out for #1, in 1977, which also became a New York Times #1 bestseller. Some of its recurring themes are action based on rational thought, conceding and in fact adhering to the inherent objective human nature of self-interest, and avoiding irrational people (which he called neurotics or "weeds").

Ringer's first political/ideological work, Restoring the American Dream, reached #3 on The New York Times Bestseller List in 1979. It was revised, updated and republished in 2010. Its premise is that liberty must be given a higher priority than all other objectives and that a laissez-faire free market is the clear solution to America's economic troubles.

Ringer established Stratford Press to publish and re-release books by other authors. Its title includes Crisis Investing by Douglas R. Casey, The Alpha Strategy by John A. Pugsley, and Nice Girls Do by Irene Kassorla. Ringer's books were distributed by Thomas Y. Crowell/Harper & Row.

Ringer has appeared on The Tonight Show, Today, The Dennis Miller Show, Good Morning America, ABC News Nightline, and The Charlie Rose Show, Fox News, and Fox Business. He has been the subject of feature articles in such publications as Time, People, The Wall Street Journal, Fortune, Barron's and The New York Times.

== Books ==
- Ringer, Robert J. (1973). Winning Through Intimidation. Ballantine Books. ISBN 0-449-20786-2.
- Ringer, Robert J. (1978). Looking Out for #1. Fawcett Crest. ISBN 0-449-21010-3.
- Ringer, Robert J. (1979). Restoring the American Dream. Fawcett Crest. ISBN 0-449-24314-1.
- Ringer, Robert J. (1983). How You Can Find Happiness During the Collapse of Western Civilization. ISBN 0-06-859606-5.
- Ringer, Robert J. (1990). Million Dollar Habits. Random House Publishing. ISBN 0-449-21878-3.
- Ringer, Robert J. (2000). Getting What You Want: The 7 Principles of Rational Living. G.P. Putnam's Sons. ISBN 0-399-14686-5.
- Ringer, Robert (2002). To Be or Not to Be Intimidated?: That is the Question. Rowman & Littlefield. ISBN 1-59077-035-8.
- Action!: Nothing Happens Until Something Moves. 2004. ISBN 978-1-5907-7058-0.
- The Entrepreneur: The Way Back for the U.S. Economy. 2012. ISBN 978-1-4516-2910-1.
