= Arthur Covey =

American muralist (1877–1960)

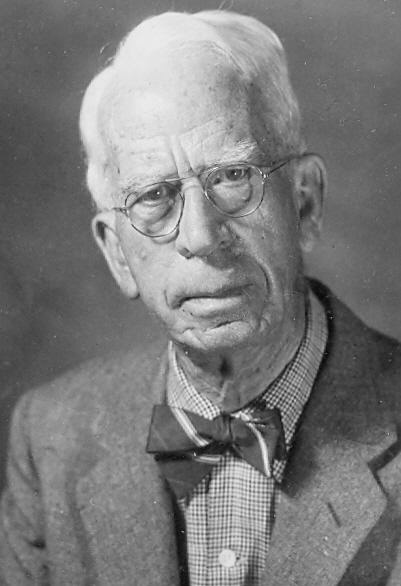
- Arthur Covey in the 1950s
- Born: June 13, 1877; Leroy, Illinois
- Died: February 5, 1960 (aged 82); Tarpon Springs, Florida
- Education: Southwestern College (Kansas), School of the Art Institute of Chicago
- Known for: Muralist
- Spouse(s): Mary Dorothea Sale (1908-1917); Lois Lenski Covey (1921-1960)

Arthur Sinclair Covey (June 13, 1877 – February 5, 1960) was an American muralist whose paintings depicted industrial workers doing their jobs.

== Personal life ==
Covey was born in Leroy, Illinois on June 13, 1877 and was married to Mary Dorothea Sale from 1908 until her death in 1917. In 1921, Covey married the artist and children's book writer Lois Lenski (1893–1974). Covey and Lenski remained married until his death in 1960. Covey's daughter from his first marriage Margaret Covey Chisholm was also a painter and muralist. In his marriage to Lois Lenski, he also had a child named Stephen.

== Education ==
Covey attended Southwestern College and studied for three years at the School of the Art Institute of Chicago, where he graduated in 1899. He later taught at the School of the Art Institute of Chicago. At the age of 16, Covey participated in the Cherokee Strip Land Run in Oklahoma on September 16, 1893. During his subsequent career as an artist, one of his frequently-reproduced drawings (from 1953) depicted this Cherokee Strip Run.

== Works ==
His works include a 1927 series of images of workers at industries in Toledo, Ohio which were first exhibited in display windows of a Toledo department store, Lasalle & Koch and seven murals showing foundry workers for the Kohler Company in Sheboygan County, Wisconsin. He was commissioned in 1936 by the Section to paint a mural in Bridgeport, Connecticut and another in Torrington, Connecticut.

The papers and much of the artwork of Arthur Covey, dating from 1882 to 1960, are stored in a collection at the Archives of American Art of the Smithsonian Institution. In 1929, Covey was elected into the National Academy of Design as an Associate Academician, and became a full Academician in 1934.

== Death ==
Arthur Covey died in Tarpon Springs, Florida on February 5, 1960.

== Selected works ==
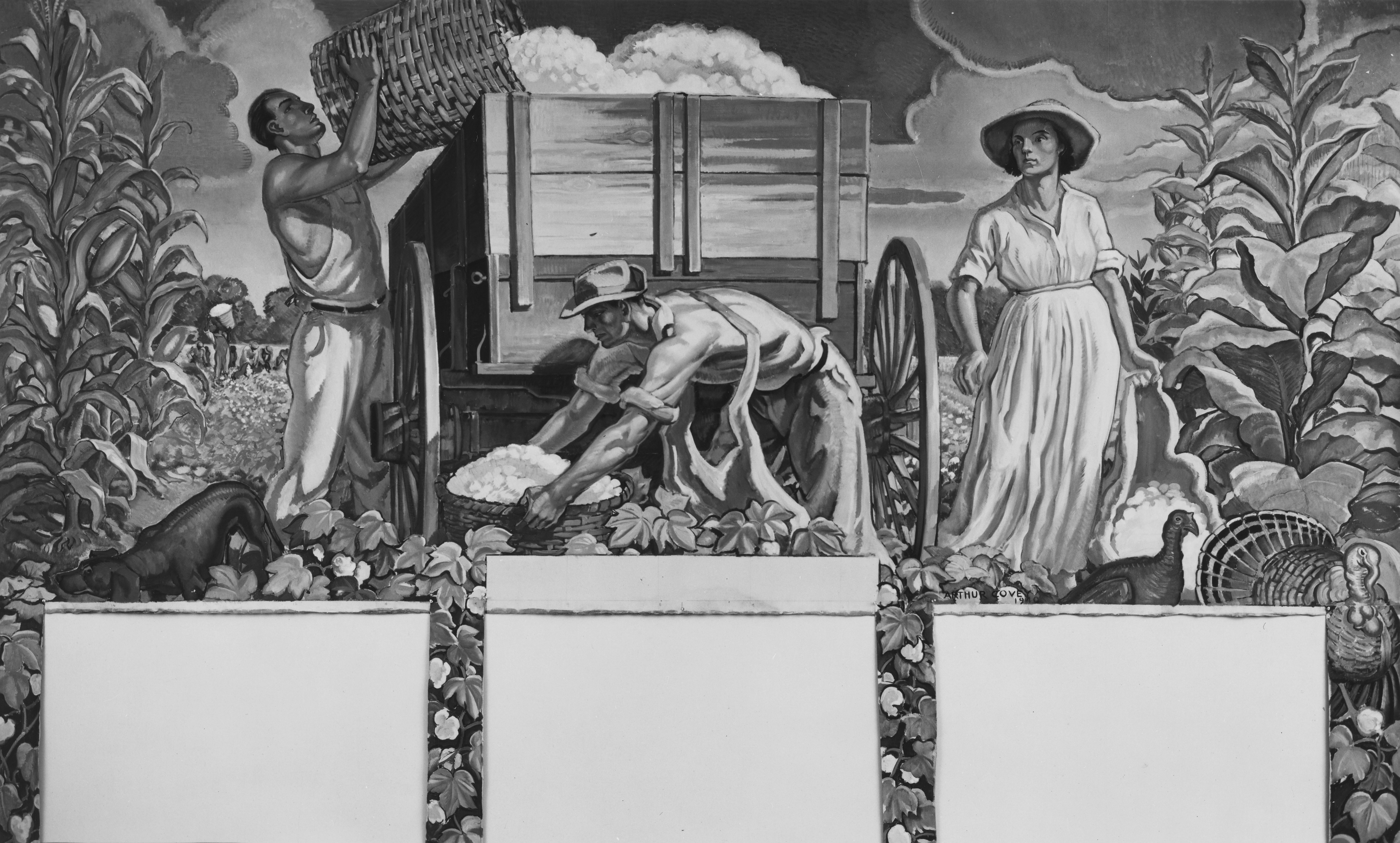
"Corn, Cotton & Tobacco Culture" Anderson, South Carolina
