= The Americans Come (An Episode in France in the Year 1918) =

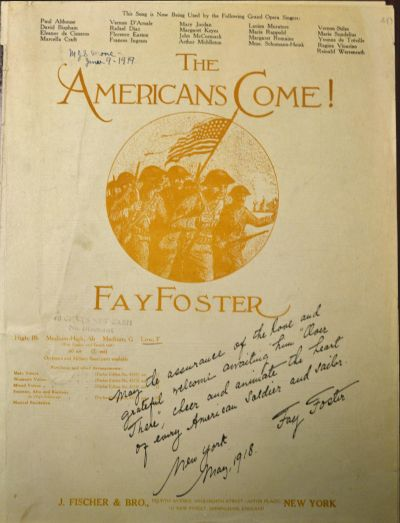
- Sheet music cover

Song
- Language: English
- Published: 1918
- Songwriter(s): Fay Foster

"The Americans Come (An Episode in France in the Year 1918)" is a World War I song written and composed by Fay Foster. The song was first published in 1918 by J. Fischer & Bro., in New York City. The sheet music cover depicts soldiers marching with a city and battleship on the left and a bombed city on the right.

The sheet music can be found at the Pritzker Military Museum & Library.
