= Father Fox's Pennyrhymes =

1971 children's book by Clyde Watson

Father Fox's Pennyrhymes is a 1971 children's book of poetry by Clyde Watson, with illustrations by her sister, Wendy Watson, published by the Thomas Y. Crowell Company. The book was a finalist for the National Book Award and was named among the Best Books of the Year by the American Library Association for 1972 and by The New York Times and School Library Journal for 1971.
