= C/O Postmaster =

1943 novel by Thomas R. St. George

- First edition cover
- Author: Thomas R St George
- Illustrator: Thomas R St George
- Language: English
- Publisher: Thomas Y. Crowell Co.
- Publication date: 1943

C/O Postmaster is a book written by Thomas R St George, and published in 1943 by Thomas Y. Crowell Co. This book was a best-seller and Book Of The Month Club selection for October 1943.

The book begins as the author leaves his Army boot camp in California in the spring of 1942. He and his fellow soldiers find themselves assigned to the 32nd Infantry Division (United States) and sent overseas.

They arrive in Australia, and spend several months in infantry training just outside a major city (Brisbane, though not identified in the book). When not on duty, the author and his friends wander around Australia, getting to know the people, meeting girls, and having various adventures.

The author's unit is then transferred to another camp in a more remote part of Australia, where training gets tougher and there are no civilians around. Finally, the entire unit is sent to New Guinea in response to a Japanese attack there. The book ends with the whole unit boarding transport aircraft for New Guinea.

C/O Postmaster is illustrated by the author's own drawings.
