= Kathleen Hart Bibb =

American concert singer and voice teacher (1889–1957)

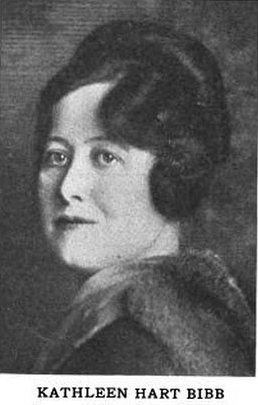
Kathleen Hart Bibb, from a 1921 publication

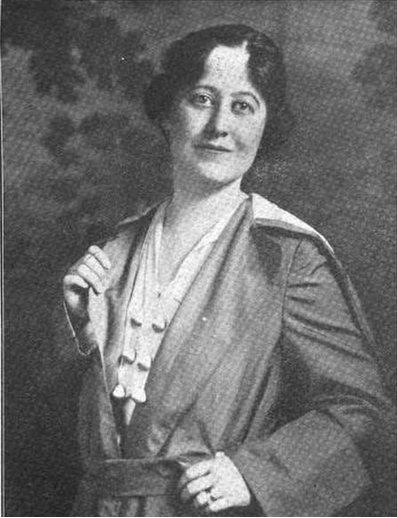
Kathleen Hart Bibb, from a 1917 publication

Kathleen Palmer Hart Bibb Foster (September 6, 1889 – June 30, 1957) was an American concert singer and voice teacher. She was also the model for the character "Julia Ray" in the popular Betsy-Tacy book series, written by her younger sister.

== Early life ==
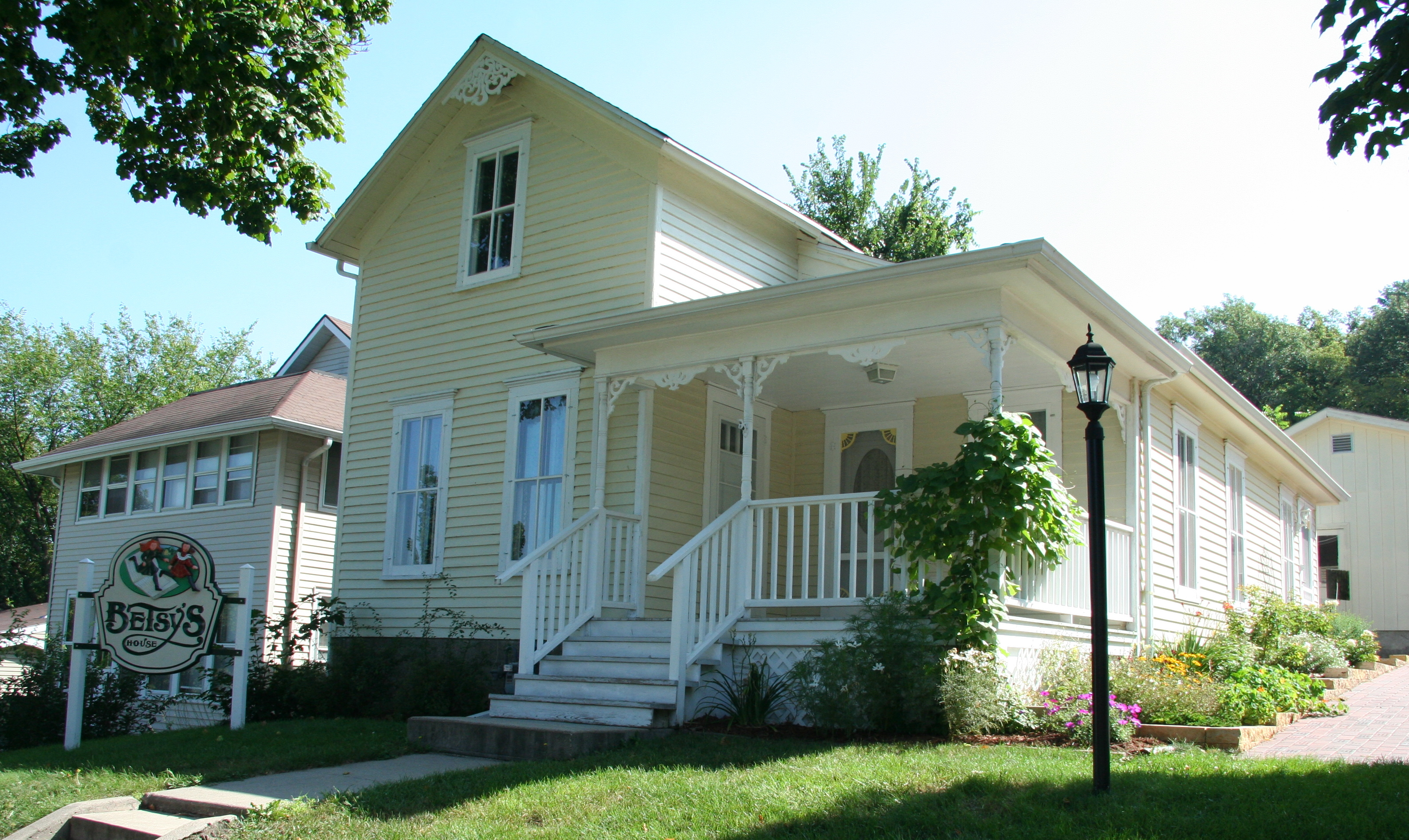
333 Center St., Mankato Minnesota, childhood home of Kathleen Hart, now a museum

Kathleen Palmer Hart was born in Mankato, Minnesota, the daughter of Thomas Walden Hart and Stella M. Palmer Hart. Her father owned a shoe store. Her younger sister Maud Hart Lovelace became a successful author, and their childhood home is now a museum about their family and her work. Maud Hart based the character "Julia Ray" on her sister Kathleen. Kathleen Hart graduated from the University of Minnesota, and studied voice in Europe.

== Career ==
Kathleen Hart Bibb started singing professionally in Minneapolis. She first sang in Chicago in 1917, in a recital at the Ziegfeld Theater. She gave her first New York concert at the Aeolian Hall in 1918. She frequently performed with her brother-in-law, pianist and composer Frank Bibb, providing accompaniment. For three seasons in the 1920s she toured the United States as a member of the Henshaw Mozart Operatic Company.

She sang for the South Dakota State Suffrage Association in 1917. During World War I Kathleen Hart Bibb performed at benefits for the troops, and for the American Red Cross. She also taught voice in Minneapolis at the MacPhail Center for Music, and at Monticello Seminary in Illinois during the 1920s. Late in life she taught voice at the University of Utah.

== Personal life ==
Kathleen Hart married twice. She first married lawyer and violinist Eugene Sharp Bibb in 1913; Eugene Bibb spent much of their marriage in the military during World War I, and was awarded three Purple Hearts, a Croix de Guerre, and other honors. Their first son died at birth in 1920; their second son, Eugene, was born in 1922. Her second husband was flutist Frohman Murphy Foster; they married in 1927, in Los Angeles, California. Kathleen Hart Foster died in 1957, aged 67 years, in Salt Lake City, Utah.
