= Indian Captive =

1941 book by Lois Lenski

First edition (publ. J.B. Lippincott)

Indian Captive: The Story of Mary Jemison is a children's biographical novel written and illustrated by Lois Lenski. The book was first published in 1941 and was a Newbery Honor recipient in 1942.Indian Captive is a historical fiction book retelling the life of Mary Jemison, with a few minor twists.

== Plot summary ==
Twelve-year-old Mary Jemison takes her peaceful days on her family's farm in eastern Pennsylvania for granted. But on a spring day in 1758, a band of Seneca warriors invade the house and take the Jemison family captive. Mary is separated from her parents and brothers and sister. She travels with the Seneca to southern Ohio and later to a Seneca village on the Genesee River in what is now western New York.

Mary's new life is not easy. She misses her family terribly, and she is unaccustomed to Seneca ways. Several times she tries to run away. But the Seneca are kind to her and teach her many things about the earth, its plants, and its creatures. They name her "Corn Tassel" after the tassels of corn when she first arrives in the village in southern Ohio, one of her favorite things. Corn Tassel makes some Seneca friends, such as Shining Star, one of the two sisters who brought her to the old village of Seneca Town before they went to Genesee Town by the Falling Waters; Little Turtle/Turkey Feather, a Seneca boy who teaches Mary how to speak the Seneca language; Earth Woman, an Indian woman who takes care of her from her arrival in Genesee Town and teaches her how to make a pot out of clay; and Beaver Girl, a Seneca girl the same age and size as Corn Tassel.

An old trader comes and delivers the news of the death of her family and neighbors, who were killed with tomahawks by the Seneca shortly after she was separated from them. Mary is finally given the chance to return to the world of white men. She decides that she will stay with her new Seneca family. The Chief of Genesee Town changes Mary's name from Corn Tassel to Little-Woman-of-Great-Courage, in honor of her courage to stay with the Indians instead of going to stay with white people, like her.
