= Thomas R. St. George =

American novelist

Thomas R. St. George (November 23, 1919 – July 29, 2014) was an American author, World War II veteran, reporter, editor, columnist and screenwriter. He was born in Simpson, Minnesota.

His best known work is C/O Postmaster, a semi-autobiographical description of his experiences in Australia as a U.S. soldier in 1942. This book was a best seller and Time Book of the Month Club selection in 1943.

St. George published a sequel to Postmaster in 1945, titled Proceed Without Delay, which chronicled his further adventures in the Pacific Theater during World War II, as a writer for Yank, the Army Weekly magazine.

After the war, St. George was a screenwriter in Hollywood, and wrote the screenplay for the film Campus Honeymoon among others. He then worked as a reporter, editor, and columnist for newspapers in Rochester, Minnesota, San Diego, Philadelphia and St. Paul, Minnesota. He retired from newspaper work in 1994, and devoted the next several years to a series of nine satirical, semi-autobiographical novels. This collection is referred to as the Eddie Devlin Compendium, published by Xlibris. This series follows a gaggle of characters from the stock market crash in 1929, through the Great Depression, World War II, to life in an old folks home at the Millennium - Old Tim's Estate (covering the years 1929–1935) Wildcat Strike (1939) The Bloody Wet (1943–1944) Bringing Chesty Home (1948) Replevy for a Flute (1956) Clyde Strikes Back (1963–1964) Flacks (1973) Deadlines (1984–1985) The Survivors (1999–2000). These books are available in print and e-book versions at XLibris, Amazon.com, and Barnes & Noble.

His published works, all of which he illustrated himself with sketches of his characters and their situations, are noted for their quirky humor, the lively immediacy with which he portrays a moment in time, and the often touching characterizations of people whom St. George obviously knew well.

In 1945, at the end of World War II, St. George married a WAC (Women's Army Corps) Staff Sergeant from Philadelphia, whom he had met in Brisbane, Australia during the war. They had four children. His first wife died in 1994, his son died in 2004 and his second wife died in 2014. His three daughters now live in Wisconsin, in Maine, and in England. St. George resided in the Rochester, Minnesota area in his later years.
