= Lois Lenski =

American author and illustrator (1893–1974)

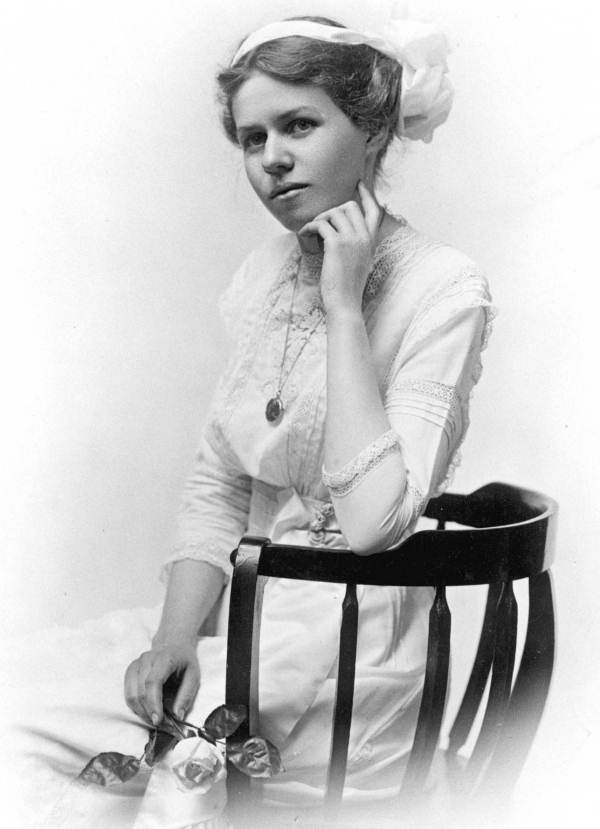
- Born: Lois Lenski; October 14, 1893; Springfield, Ohio, United States
- Died: September 11, 1974 (aged 80); Tarpon Springs, Florida
- Education: Ohio State University, Art Students League of New York, Westminster School of Art
- Occupations: Writer, illustrator
- Writing career
- Period: 1920–1974
- Genres: Children's novels, picture books
- Notable awards: Newbery Medal; 1946 Strawberry Girl

Lois Lenore Lenski Covey (October 14, 1893 – September 11, 1974) was a Newbery Medal-winning author and illustrator of picture books and children's literature. Beginning in 1927 with her first books, Skipping Village and Jack Horner's Pie: A Book of Nursery Rhymes, Lenski published 98 books, including several posthumously. Her work includes children's picture books and illustrated chapter books, songbooks, poetry, short stories, her 1972 autobiography, Journey into Childhood, and essays about books and children's literature. Her best-known bodies of work include the "Mr. Small" series of picture books (1934–62); her "Historical" series of novels, including the Newbery Honor-winning titles Phebe Fairchild: Her Book (1936) and Indian Captive: The Story of Mary Jemison (1941); and her "Regional" series, including Newbery Medal-winning Strawberry Girl (1945) and Children's Book Award-winning Judy's Journey (1947).

Lenski also provided illustrations for books by other authors, including the first edition of The Little Engine that Could by Watty Piper (1930), and the first four volumes of Maud Hart Lovelace's Betsy-Tacy series (1940–1943).

In 1967 Lenski established the Lois Lenski Covey Foundation, which provides grants for book purchases to libraries and organizations serving children who are socially and economically at risk.

== Biography ==
=== Early life and education ===
Lenski was the fourth of five children born to Richard C. H. Lenski, a Prussian-born Lutheran clergyman and theologian, and Marietta Young Lenski, a Franklin County, Ohio native, who was a schoolteacher before her marriage. When Lois was six, her family moved to the small town of Anna, Ohio, where her father was called to be a pastor. Lenski was encouraged to pursue her talent for art by adults in her life, including teachers, a visiting artist—who, she later recalled, advised her father to buy her a high-quality set of paints because she had talent—and her father, who did so. But she also remembered that no one encouraged her to "be original" or draw what she saw around her during her childhood, describing her work until the age of 15 as copying from other pictures.

After commuting by train to high school in Sidney, Ohio, Lenski graduated in 1911. She then attended Ohio State University, graduating in 1915 with a B.S. in education and a teaching certificate. Her minor was in fine arts, with her coursework concentrating on drawing and lettering. After graduating from Ohio State, Lenski received a scholarship to the Art Students League in New York, where she studied until 1920. During this time she also studied illustration at the School of Industrial Art in New York. In 1920, Lenski traveled to London, studying at the Westminster School of Art in 1920–21. She then spent several months traveling in Italy before returning to the United States.

=== Marriage and family life ===
On June 8, 1921, immediately after her return from Italy, Lenski married Arthur Covey, a muralist who had been one of her instructors at the School of Industrial Art and for whom she had worked as an assistant on mural projects before she left for London. Covey was a widower with two young children, and in 1929 Lenski and Covey had a son, Stephen. The family then moved from Westchester County to "Greenacres," a farmhouse in Harwinton, Connecticut, built in 1790.

Covey, who was 16 years older than Lenski, expected his wife to take full responsibility for the household and children even if doing so meant that she would have no time for creative work. Lenski, however, refused to give up, later writing that Covey's attitude helped her to realize how important her work was to her. She hired household help when she could and carved out time to work in her studio.

==== Influence on her literary career ====
As Lenski progressed in her literary and artistic career, her family and home life served as important sources of inspiration for her work. Two of the first books she wrote and illustrated, Skipping Village (1927) and A Little Girl of 1900 (1928), drew upon her childhood in small-town Ohio, which she idealized, describing it in her autobiography as "simple, sincere, and wholesome." The "Mr. Small" series of books was inspired by watching her young son Stephen and his friends play with toy trucks, airplanes and other vehicles and realizing that the children tended to see themselves as the operators of the vehicles, like the eponymous Mr. Small, rather than anthropomorphizing them into characters. She would later base two other picture book series, the "Davy" and "Debbie" books, on her experiences with a grandson and granddaughter. Her first historical novel, Phebe Fairchild: Her Book, was inspired by living at Greenacres, describing life as it could have been lived at the house in the 1830s.

In the early 1940s, Lenski was told by her doctor that for the sake of her health she needed to avoid Connecticut's harsh winters. The family began to spend their winters in the southern United States, first visiting Louisiana and then Florida. During these trips Lenski observed the social and economic differences between this region of the country and her familiar Midwest and Northeast, inspiring her to write about the ways of life experienced by children in diverse American regions. Although her writing was interrupted by illness in the early 1950s, she continued the project of writing regional stories until 1968.

=== Later life ===
In 1951 Lenski and Covey built a house at Tarpon Springs, Florida, where they spent half of each year. After Covey's death in 1960, Lenski moved permanently to Florida. She continued to write, publishing her last picture book, Debbie and her Pets, in 1971 and her autobiography in 1972. In 1967 she established the Lois Lenski Covey Foundation. Beginning in 1959, her achievements were recognized with honorary doctorates from Wartburg College (1959), UNC-Greensboro (1962), and Capital University in Columbus, Ohio, where her father had once taught (1966). In 1967 she was awarded the Regina Medal by the Catholic Library Association and the Children's Collection Medal by the University of Southern Mississippi. Lenski died September 11, 1974, at her home in Tarpon Springs.

== Early artistic and literary career ==
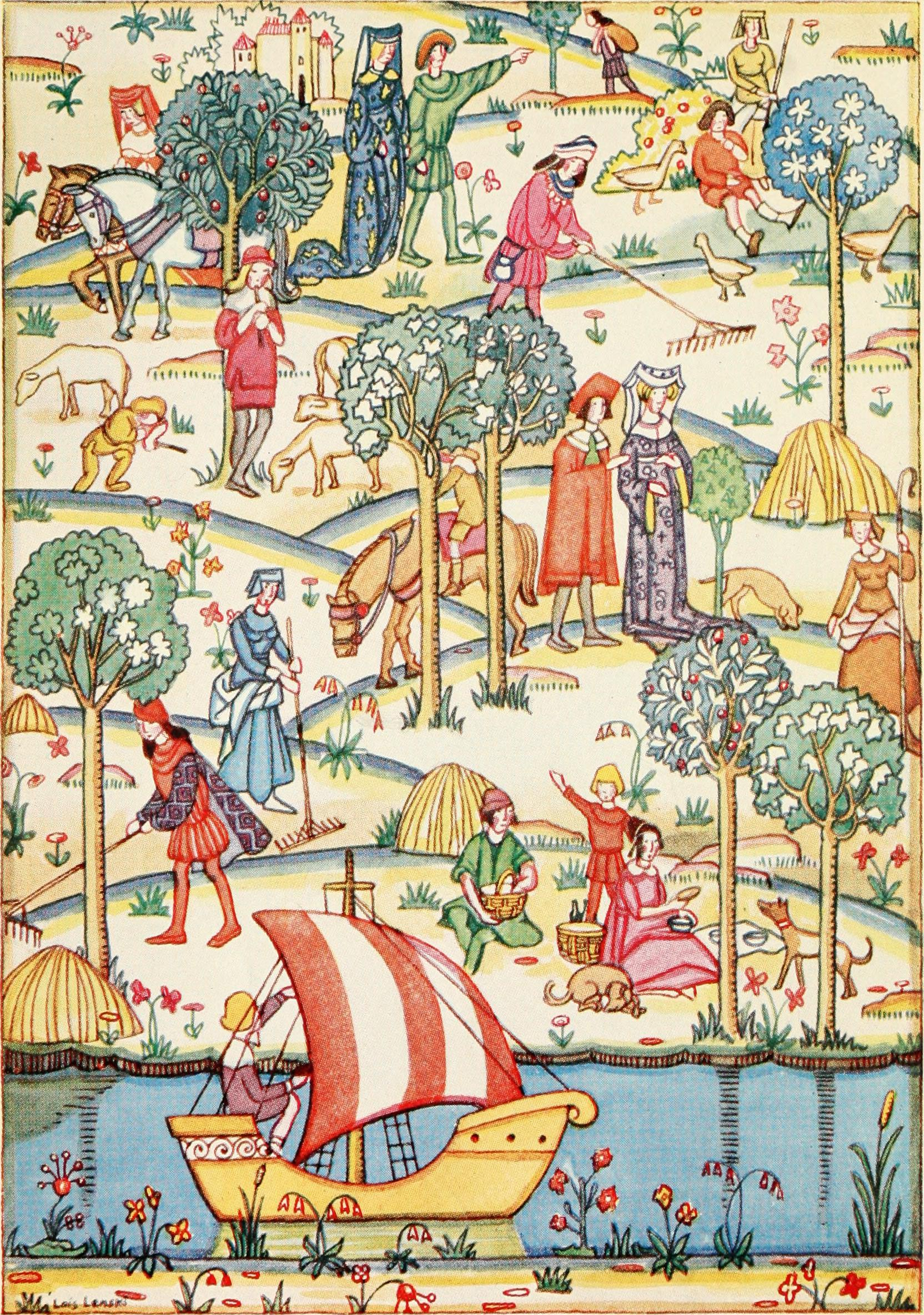
One of Lenski's illustrations for the 1922 John Lane edition of Kenneth Grahame's Dream Days.

Lenski's first professional goal was to become a painter. Her oil paintings were shown at the Weyhe Gallery in New York in 1927 and her watercolors were shown at the Ferargils Gallery in New York in 1932. During this period she also worked as an illustrator, beginning with jobs she took to support herself while studying at the Art Students League between 1915 and 1920. Her first publication was a coloring book called A Children's Frieze Book: To-Put-Together for Home Decoration (1918), for which she was paid $100. She also produced three books of paper dolls for the same publisher, Platt and Munk, during 1918 and 1919. In 1920 Lenski chose to study in London in part because it was the longstanding center of children's book publishing, a field in which American educators, publishers and librarians began to engage seriously only after World War I. In London she illustrated three children's books for the publisher John Lane, including new editions of two stories by Wind in the Willows author Kenneth Grahame. After returning to the United States she continued to work as an illustrator, focusing primarily on collections of folktales and fairy tales during the 1920s. Among the first books for which she provided text as well as illustrations was a collection of nursery rhymes.

In 1927, pioneering children's book editor Helen Dean Fish suggested that Lenski should try writing and illustrating her own stories. She originally wrote her first book, Skipping Village, as poetry, changing it to prose at the request of her editor. Decades later, she would return to writing poetry and song lyrics. In 1932 Lenski published The Little Family, an innovative picture book which was the first such book sized to fit small children's hands (the current edition of the book measures 5 × 5.8 inches).

Until the mid-1940s Lenski continued to illustrate other authors' books as well as her own, working with writers including Maud Hart Lovelace, Watty Piper, and Hugh Lofting. However, her biographer Bobbie Malone notes that while Lenski wrote about her work as an illustrator in the 1920s in her autobiography, she did not mention her later work of this type, even on "landmark" books like Piper's Little Engine and Lovelace's Betsy-Tacy books.

== Development of style and methods ==
Although Lenski's many books included diverse subject matter and were written for children of a range of ages, she considered their underlying common thread to be the ordinary experiences of children in their world. In 1964 she wrote:

Through all my poems run the same themes, concepts and values that rear again and again in my stories. It is of interest to note that my very first book, Skipping Village, was originally titled: A Child's Town. This theme - a child and his town, or a child and his environment - can be traced through all my books. It is obvious in two of my latest picture books, At Our House and I Went For a Walk, and is behind all of Mr. Small's activities. It runs through my historical books, which portray children and family life in early periods of our history, and it is the basic theme behind my Regional and Roundabout America books. Whether a short picture book, a scholarly historical study, or an interpretation of some phase of life in contemporary America, my books are essentially family stories, reflecting the child in his environment.

=== Historical novels ===
In the early 1930s, Lenski began to apply her approach to storytelling to children's historical fiction. Her first historical novel, Phebe Fairchild: Her Book (1936), was inspired by her life in Connecticut. The story was about a girl's experience of what might now be termed culture shock when she was sent to spend a year with her Puritanical relatives in rural Connecticut during the 1830s. Lenski conducted extensive research for Phebe Fairchild and her subsequent historical and regional novels, including site visits and archival research in her quest to accurately present the physical settings, material culture, speech patterns, and other aspects of the daily lives of her protagonists, as well as their broader social and historical contexts. Malone explains that when Lenski's editor Helen Dean Fish saw a draft of the book, she objected to the way that Lenski, seeking to accurately portray how 1830s-era New England culture marginalized and subordinated children's experiences, had pushed the character of Phebe to the margins of the story. Fish insisted that for the sake of the plot Phebe had to be made central. As Lenski wrote more historical novels, she learned how to create compelling child protagonists, how to balance story and historical details, and how to use her illustrations to support her goal of showing readers how people lived their daily lives.

=== Regional and Roundabout America novels ===
When Lenski and her family began to spend winters in the Southeastern United States during the early 1940s, she was struck by the differences between this part of the country and her familiar New England and Midwest. The first books in what would become her Regional series were inspired by her winter visits to the South, which led her to the conclusion that while American children could read about the lives of their contemporaries in other countries, there were no books available to introduce the children of various American regions to one another. During the winter of 1941–42, while she was staying in New Orleans, she became acquainted with children and their families in the village of Lafitte, near Bayou Barataria. The friends she made in the community and the stories they told her became an important part of Bayou Suzette (1943), the story of a Cajun (or, as Lenski said, "bayou-French") girl in the bayou country during the early twentieth century. The following winter Lenski visited Lakeland, Florida, where she again befriended local people, conducted interviews and read about the area's history, and observed daily life around her, including the children who participated in the strawberry harvest. The resulting book, Strawberry Girl (1945), told the story of a family from North Carolina who migrated to Florida at the turn of the twentieth century and their interactions with the region's "cracker" culture. By the time that Strawberry Girl won the Newbery Award in 1946, Lenski had begun to understand it, along with Bayou Suzette and her work in progress Blue Ridge Billy, about a musical boy living in the North Carolina mountains during the early twentieth century, as the beginning of a series of regional books representing a new direction in children's literature.

Although the first three Regional books were historical novels, with Judy's Journey (1947) Lenski turned her attention to the contemporary issue of migrant labor. Many of the subsequent Regional books would also have contemporary settings. After Judy's Journey—which, like its predecessors, was set in areas that Lenski had visited during her seasonal travels—Lenski also broadened the geographic scope of her research and set regional stories throughout the country. As the series grew in popularity, its fans wrote to her and invited her to visit their communities. Some of the books directly resulted from this correspondence; for example, in 1947 Lenski traveled to Mississippi County, Arkansas, after a class in the rural community of Yarbro heard her read aloud on the radio and invited her to visit. Cotton in My Sack (1949), a story about a young girl in a sharecropping family, was inspired by her stay in northeast Arkansas.

In the early 1950s, Lenski began to use the research she had compiled for her regional books for a second series, "Roundabout America." These books were requested by teachers and designed for children who were too old for her picture books, but too young for her regional and historical novels. This series included regionally-themed short story collections and short chapter books.

Lenski continued to write Regional and Roundabout books until 1968. The final title, Deer Valley Girl, was set in northern Vermont and presented issues including animal welfare, the complexity of life in a small, close-knit community, and the tensions created by outsiders coming to the valley to hunt its deer.

=== Poetry, lyrics and plays ===
After a two-decade hiatus, Lenski returned to poetry in the late 1940s, while she was researching and writing Cotton in My Sack. She later explained that she needed a song for her white cotton-pickers, and as the only picking songs she had found during her research belonged to the distinctive traditions of African-American pickers, she wrote a song for her characters. In the early 1950s, a prolonged illness prevented her from working on books, but she was able to write poems and lyrics. Collaborating with the author and composer Clyde Robert Bulla, she produced a book of hymns and two other songbooks.

When she returned to writing books, she began to include songs and poems in each Regional and Roundabout title. In the foreword of The Life I Live, a collection of poems published in 1964, she explained that "I feel that I have been better able to express the essence of their [children's] lives through the medium of verse than in my story-telling."

Lenski's concern about the plight of migrant laborers, which she had discovered while researching Judy's Journey, led to her involvement with the Division of Home Missions of the National Council of Churches, which began to advocate and provide services for migrant workers and their children during the early 1950s. In 1952 she and Bulla wrote three plays about migrant families as a way of calling attention to the issue. In The Bean Pickers, an African American mother and her two children followed the bean crops north along the east coast; A Change of Heart was about a Tejano family in Illinois; and Strangers in a Strange Land followed a displaced mining family from Kentucky to Arkansas for cotton-picking. The plays were distributed by the NCC for use by children.

== Authorial approach ==
Beginning with her first historical novels, Lenski sought to depict her characters' environments as accurately as possible through her writing and illustrations. She understood her role as that of an outsider whose job was to observe, document, and share what she had learned with other outsiders. Malone argues that this attitude reflected the broader patterns of documentary realism that came to prominence in American arts and letters during the Great Depression, especially through the work of WPA-affiliated artists and writers. Lenski often wrote dialogue in dialect form, explaining in the foreword to Blue Ridge Billy that "to give the flavor of a region, to suggest the moods of the people, the atmosphere of the place, speech cannot be overlooked." She wrote, "it seems to me sacrilege to transfer their speech to correct, grammatical, School-Reader English, made easy enough for the dullest child to read." Overall, she committed herself to transmitting the experiences of her informants without sanitizing them to remove sad or difficult material; she wrote that her child readers agreed with this decision, since "life is not all happy." In addition to including childhood problems and concerns in her plots, she revealed the grim and hazardous aspects of life in the communities represented by her characters, including descriptions of poverty, social and economic instability, and violence that she had observed or learned about through her research. In her acceptance speech for the Newbery Award for Strawberry Girl, a book which includes a running conflict between the family of her heroine and their drunken, feckless and violent neighbor, Lenski stated that leaving out such things would "paint a false picture."

Nonetheless, Lenski's pedagogical goals extended beyond presenting accurate portraits of the communities she described. She wanted her books to convey a sense of tolerance and acceptance of difference, mutual respect, empathy and pride in the country's cultural richness. She explained her approach as follows: "We need to know our country better. We need to know not only our own region, where our roots are firmly put down, but other regions where people different from ourselves—people of different races, faiths, cultures and backgrounds…..When we know them, understand how they live and why, we will think of them as 'people'—human beings like ourselves."

She also intended the books to promote empathy and, through the characters' experiences, serve as examples of social and emotional growth. She wrote, "I am trying to say to children that all people are flesh and blood and have feelings like themselves, no matter where they live or how simply they live or how little they have; that man's material comforts should not be the end and object of life. I am trying to point out that people of character, people who are guided by spiritual values, come often from simple surroundings, and are worthy of our admiration and even our emulation."

=== Controversies and criticism ===
When they were published, Lenski's books were considered innovative because of their realistic, multi-faceted depictions of the communities she presented. Comparing them to other children's literature of the day, critics described Lenski's Regional books as "grim" because of their focus on the experiences of members of socially and economically marginalized groups in the United States. By emphasizing accuracy and refusing to sanitize her stories, Lenski aligned herself with progressive librarians and educators who believed that children's literature should take a realistic approach to everyday life and promote increased social awareness in young readers. Their opponents believed that childhood should be treated as an innocent time, and books for children should shield them from life's problems rather than introducing problems to them.

Modern reassessments of the books acknowledge the importance of her innovations but have become much more critical of the didactic elements of her work. Kathleen Hardee Arsenaut concludes that Lenski's "determined view that good character and loving families will invariably overcome social prejudice and economic injustice strikes the modern reader as naive and simplistic," and that her insistence on happy endings through "hopefulness, kindness and self-control" undermined her effectiveness as a purveyor of social realism and at times, as in the case of her work to publicize the conditions faced by migrant workers, an activist.

Lenski's portrayals of relationships between white and non-white people, in particular the interactions between Native American and white characters in Bayou Suzette and Indian Captive, have also been criticized. Children's literature scholar Debbie Reese further questions Lenski's reputation for historical accuracy, pointing out that in writing Indian Captive Lenski departed from the historical record of Mary Jemison's captivity in order to convey that "whiteness is special."

== Selected works ==
- Picture book series
  - Mr. Small books (1934–1962)
  - Davy books (1941–1961)
  - Debbie books (1967–71)
  - Seasons books (1945–53)
- Historical series
  - Phebe Fairchild, Her Book (1936, Newbery Honor book, 2020 new release)
  - A-Going to the Westward (1937)
  - Bound Girl of Cobble Hill (1938)
  - Ocean-Born Mary (1939, 2020 new release)
  - Blueberry Corners (1940)
  - Indian Captive: The Story of Mary Jemison (1941, Newbery Honor book)
  - Puritan Adventure (1944)
- Roundabout America series
  - We Live in the South (1952)
  - Peanuts for Billy Ben (1952)
  - We Live in the City (1954)
  - Project Boy (1954)
  - Berries in the Scoop (1956)
  - We Live by the River (1956)
  - Little Sioux Girl (1958)
  - We Live in the Country (1960)
  - We Live in the Southwest (1962)
  - We Live in the North(1965)
  - High-Rise Secret (1966)
- Regional series
  - Bayou Suzette (1943, Ohioana Book Award winner for juvenile literature)
  - Strawberry Girl (1945, Newbery Award winner)
  - Blue Ridge Billy (1946)
  - Judy's Journey (1947, Children's Book Award winner)
  - Boom Town Boy (1948)
  - Cotton in My Sack (1949)
  - Texas Tomboy (1950)
  - Prairie School (1951)
  - Mama Hattie's Girl (1953)
  - Corn-Farm Boy (1954)
  - San Francisco Boy (1955)
  - Flood Friday (1956)
  - Houseboat Girl (1957)
  - Coal Camp Girl (1959)
  - Shoo-Fly Girl (1963)
  - To Be a Logger (1967)
  - Deer Valley Girl (1968)
