= Maud Hart Lovelace =

American writer

Mrs Maude Hart Lovelace
- Born: Maud Palmer Hart; April 25, 1892; Mankato, Minnesota
- Died: March 11, 1980 (aged 87); Claremont, California
- Resting place: Mankato, Minnesota
- Citizenship: USA
- Writing career
- Language: English

Maud Hart Lovelace (April 25, 1892 – March 11, 1980) was an American writer best known for the Betsy-Tacy series.

== Early life ==
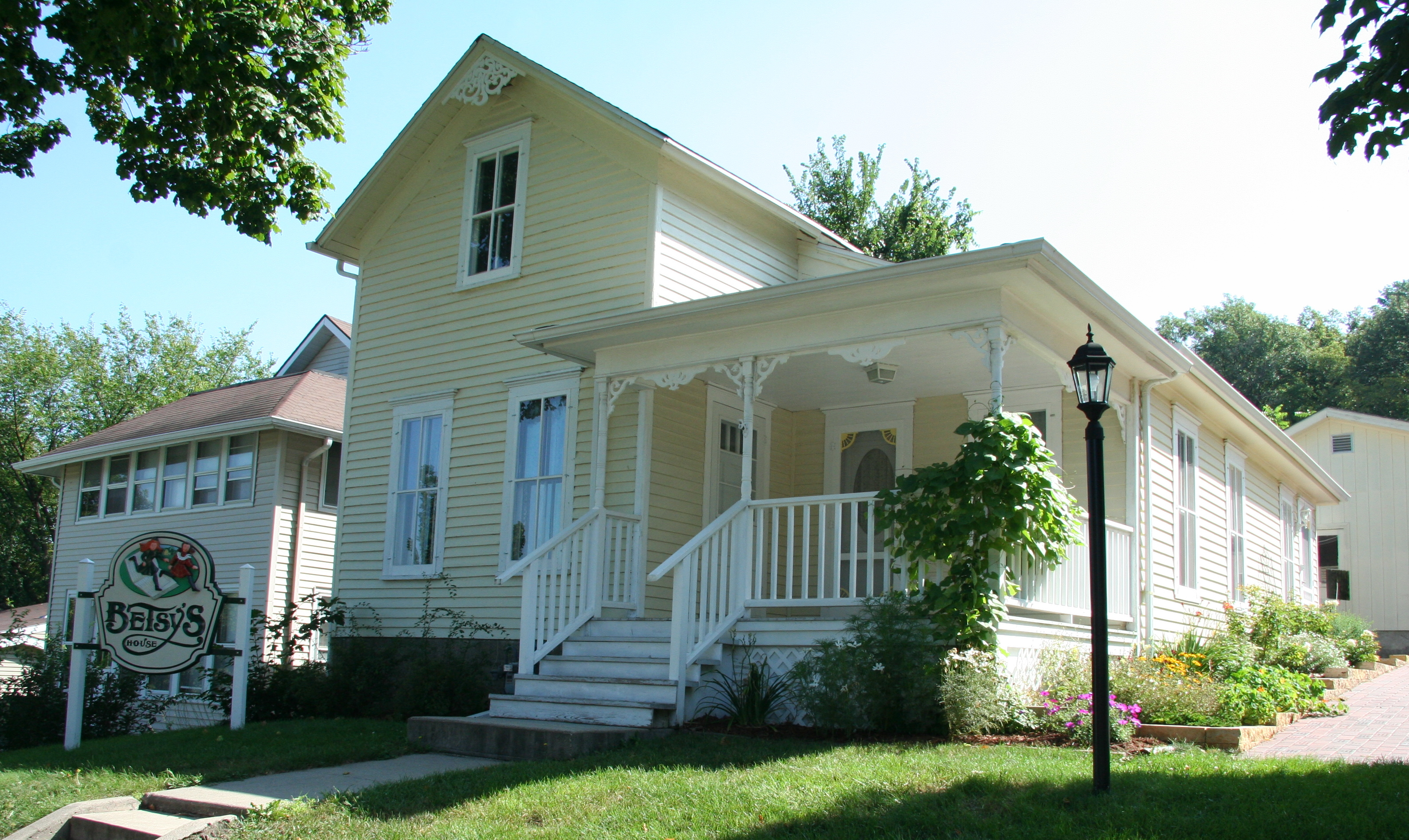
Childhood home of Maud Hart Lovelace, now a museum, at 333 Center Street, Mankato, Minnesota

Maud Palmer Hart was born in Mankato, Minnesota to Tom Hart, a shoe store owner, and his wife, Stella (née Palmer). Maud was the middle child; her sisters were Kathleen (the basis for Julia in the Betsy-Tacy books) and Helen (the basis for Margaret). Maud reportedly started writing as soon as she could hold a pencil. She wrote in her high school's essay contest during her junior and senior years.

She was baptized in a Baptist church but joined the Episcopal church as a teenager. She went on to the University of Minnesota but took a leave of absence to go to California to recover at her maternal grandmother's home from an appendectomy. It was while in California that she made her first short story sale – to the Los Angeles Times Magazine. She returned to the university and worked for the Minnesota Daily, but did not graduate.

While spending a year in Europe in 1914, she met Paolo Conte, an Italian musician (who later inspired the character Marco in Betsy and the Great World). Hart married the writer Delos Lovelace when she was 25. Delos and Hart met in April 1917 and were married on Thanksgiving Day the same year. They lived apart until 1919, however, because of Delos's military service in the First World War.

Later, the couple divided their time between Minneapolis and New York (including Yonkers and Mount Vernon) for several years. After 1928, they lived in New York permanently until their retirement in Claremont, California.

They had one daughter, Merian (later Merian Lovelace Kirchner; January 18, 1931—September 25, 1997), named for Delos's friend Merian C. Cooper, who directed the film King Kong, which was novelized by Delos.

== Literary career ==
Lovelace's first book was The Black Angels, which was published in 1926 and is a historical novel set in Minnesota. She wrote several more historical novels, including the successful Early Candlelight (1929).

Lovelace is best known for her books for children. The Betsy-Tacy series started in 1938 after Lovelace told stories about her childhood to her own daughter, Merian. The character Betsy is based on Lovelace herself; Tacy is based on her childhood best friend, Frances "Bick" Kenney. The first book in the series, Betsy-Tacy, was published in 1940, and the last book, Betsy's Wedding, was published in 1955. The first four books increase in reading difficulty so that the child can grow up along with Betsy-Tacy. The Betsy-Tacy books take place mostly in the fictional town of Deep Valley, Minnesota, which is based on Mankato. They cover the period from the late 1890s, when Betsy is five years old, until World War One, by which time Betsy is newly married and has recently completed a grand tour of Europe.

There are also three loosely connected books set in Deep Valley: Winona's Pony Cart, Emily of Deep Valley and Carney's House Party, in which Betsy and Tacy have minor roles. The series has been enduringly popular. The city of Mankato declared Betsy-Tacy Day on October 7, 1961.

== Death ==
Lovelace spent her later years in Claremont, California, where she died in 1980. She is buried in the Glenwood Cemetery in Mankato, with a monument dedicated to her.

== Legacy ==
The Maud Hart Lovelace Book Award was established in 1980. Each year, a group of nominees is chosen in two categories: grades 3–5 and grades 6–8. Children who have read at least three books in the relevant category cast a vote for their favorite. Whoever gets the most votes wins the award and $100.

== Bibliography ==
- The Black Angels (1926)
- Early Candlelight (1929)
- Petticoat Court (1930)
- The Charming Sally (1932)
- One Stayed At Welcome (1934, with Delos Lovelace)
- Gentlemen From England (1937, with Delos Lovelace)
- The Golden Wedge: Indian Legends of South America (1942, with Delos Lovelace)
- The Tune Is In The Tree (1950)
- The Trees Kneel At Christmas (1951)
- What Cabrillo Found (1958)
- The Valentine Box (1966)

=== Betsy-Tacy series ===
- Betsy-Tacy (1940)
- Betsy-Tacy and Tib (1941)
- Betsy and Tacy Go Over the Big Hill (1942)
- Betsy and Tacy Go Downtown (1943)
- Heaven to Betsy (1945)
- Betsy in Spite of Herself (1946)
- Betsy Was a Junior (1947)
- Betsy and Joe (1948)
- Betsy and the Great World (1952)
- Betsy's Wedding (1955)

=== Deep Valley series ===
- Carney's House Party (1949)
- Emily of Deep Valley (1950)
- Winona's Pony Cart (1953)

=== Short stories ===
- Auction (with Delos W. Lovelace), (ss) The Country Gentleman August 2, 1924
- Borghild’s Clothes (with Delos W. Lovelace), (ss) The Modern Priscilla April 1922
- Carcassonne Flyer, (ss) Sunset Magazine April 1925
- Carmelita, Widow (with Delos W. Lovelace), (ss) Catholic World October 1924
- East Wind (with Delos W. Lovelace), (ss) The Country Gentleman April 26, 1924
- Land (with Delos W. Lovelace), (ss) Liberty August 9, 1924
- Laughing Tyrant (with Delos W. Lovelace), (ss) The Country Gentleman March 29, 1924
- Little White Lamb, The, (ss) The Delineator June 1924
- Love’s Daily Dozen, (ss) The Delineator August 1925
- Maid and the Hope Chest, The, (ss) (with Delos W. Lovelace) Metropolitan Magazine May 1924
- Neighbors (with Delos W. Lovelace), (ss) The Country Gentleman September 27, 1924
- One Day to Live (with Delos W. Lovelace), (ss) The Delineator October 1925
