= Thomas Y. Crowell Co. =

American publishing company

- Status: Defunct (sold to Harper & Row in 1978)
- Founded: 1876
- Founder: Thomas Y. Crowell
- Successor: Harper & Row
- Country of origin: United States
- Headquarters location: New York, New York
- Key people: Thomas Y. Crowell (founder)
- Publication types: Books

Thomas Y. Crowell Co. was a publishing company founded by Thomas Y. Crowell. The company began as a bookbindery founded by Benjamin Bradley in 1834. Crowell operated the business after Bradley's death in 1862 and eventually purchased the company from Bradley's widow in 1870.

Based in New York City, Thomas Y. Crowell Co. operated for a total of 102 years before being sold to Harper & Row in 1978. The Crowell name survived for another 2 years as part of Lippincott & Crowell, before both were merged into Harper & Row itself in 1980.

== History ==
The company began publishing books in 1876, and in 1882 T. Irving Crowell joined his father in the business. Jeremiah Osborne Crowell became the sales manager.

In 1909, after Thomas Y. Crowell died, T. Irving Crowell became the company's president. Then in 1937, after T. Irving Crowell retired, the third generation Robert L. Crowell took over and moved towards publishing trade books and biographies. They were sold to Dun & Bradstreet in 1968. Dun & Bradstreet acquired Funk & Wagnalls in 1971.

Crowell acquired the textbook publisher Intext in 1974, which also owned the trade publishers Abelard-Schuman (itself formed by the merger of the Abelard Press and Henry Schuman Inc.) and the John Day Company.

In 1978, the company was sold to Harper & Row, which bought Lippincott and briefly combined the two as Lippincott & Crowell in 1979 before consolidating them into Harper & Row in 1980.

The Thomas Y. Crowell Publishers Records are housed in the Syracuse University Library's Special Collections Research Center. The records are composed mainly of correspondence with authors, agents, other publishing firms and interested persons.

== Published works ==
=== Reference works ===
- The French Revolution, A History (1 volume), 1893
- Works of Washington Irving
- Roget's Thesaurus International
- The Dictionary of Business and Finance
- a Social Studies Series
- The Radio Amateur's Handbook (at least 1964–1970)
- Benet's Reader's Encyclopedia
- The Soldiers' Diary and Note Book, revised edition
- Dictionary of American Slang, 1960
- Motion Pictures in Education

=== Fiction ===
- Cheaper by the Dozen, 1948, by Frank Bunker Gilbreth Jr. and Ernestine Gilbreth Carey
- Frank Heller detective/mystery series,
- The Works of William Shakespeare by William Shakespeare (undated)
- Eight books in the Nine to Twelve Series for older children
- The Children of the Valley by Harriet Prescott Spofford
- Little Dick's Son by Kate Gannett Wells
- Marcia & the Major by J.L. Harbour
- Song of the Bell by Friedrich Schiller
- How Dexter Paid His Way by Kate Upson Clark
- The Flatiron and the Red Cloak by Abby Morton Diaz
- In the Poverty Year by Marian Douglas
- Little Sky-High by Hezekiah Butterworth
- The Little Cave-Dwellers by Ella Farman Pratt
- The Poetical Works of John Milton by John Milton
- Westward the Sun by Brigid Knight (1942)
- The Betsy-Tacy books by Maud Hart Lovelace
- "Jed - A Boy's Adventure in the Army of 61-65 - A Story of Battle and Prison, of Peril and Escape" by Warren Lee Goss
- "Poems, Plays and Essays" of Oliver Goldsmith, M.B.
- "Poems: 'Longfellow's Early Poems" by Henry Wadsworth Longfellow
- Poems:Selections From The Poetical Works of Robert Browning Second Series
- "Poems: 'The Courtship of Miles Standish'" by Henry Wadsworth Longfellow
- "Poems: 'The Complete Poetical Works of Robert Burns" © 1900
- "Poems: 'The Poems of Robert Louis Stevenson, with an Introduction by William Peterfield Trent" (1900)
- "Poems: 'Idylls of the King' by Alfred Lord Tennyson (1885)
- "Poems: 'Proctor's Poems'" by Adelaide Anne Proctor (1880)
- "Poems: 'Macaulay's Poems" by Lord Thomas Macaulay
- "Poems: 'Byron's Poetical Works : The Poems and Dramas of Lord Byron' by George Gordon, Lord Byron (1903)
- Rifles for Watie by Harold Keith (1957) (1958 Newbery Award)
- Faust: A Tragedy. by Goethe, Ed. F.H. Hedge, D.D.
- Cranford by Mrs. Gaskell
- Ivanhoe: A Romance, by Sir Walter Scott, Bart., 1898 (illustrated by Allan Stewart)
- Father Fox's Pennyrhymes, children's book of poetry by Clyde Watson, with illustrations by her sister, Wendy Watson
- Wordsworth's Complete Poetical Works...New York Thomas Y. Crowell Company Publishers (The Complete Poetical works of William Wordsworth with an introduction by John Morley dated 1888)
- Elegy Written in a Country Churchyard by Thomas Gray ... New York Thomas Y. Crowell & Co. Publishers
- The Drugstore Cat by Ann Petry and illustrated by Susanne Suba (1949)

=== Nonfiction ===
- Life of George Eliot as Related in Her Letters and Journals. Arranged and Edited by Her Husband, J. W. Cross. Illustrated. New York: Thomas Y. Crowell & Co., Publishers. ND [c. 1890]. x + 764 pp. & 17 illustrations.
- C/O Postmaster (1943) by Thomas R. St. George
- Winning Through Intimidation (1973) and Looking Out for #1 (1977) by Robert Ringer
- RN: The Memoirs of Richard Nixon (1978)

=== Book series ===
- Astor Edition of Poetry
- Astor Edition of Prose
- Astor Library of Standard Literature
- Children's Favorite Classics
- Crowell's Colonial Series
- Crowell's Red Line Poets
- Famous Men and Women Library
- Half-Hour Classics
- Handy Volume Classics
- Luxembourg Edition
- Luxembourg Illustrated Classics Series
- Luxembourg Illustrated Library
- Masters of Contemporary Photography
- Popular Books for Young People (also known as: Crowell's Library for Young People)
- Sunday School Library, No. 1
- Well Spent Hour Library
- What is Worth While Series
