= National Register of Historic Places listings in Redwood County, Minnesota =

Location of Redwood County in Minnesota

This is a list of the National Register of Historic Places listings in Redwood County, Minnesota. It is intended to be a complete list of the properties and districts on the National Register of Historic Places in Redwood County, Minnesota, United States. The locations of National Register properties and districts for which the latitude and longitude coordinates are included below, may be seen in an online map.

There are 22 properties and districts listed on the National Register in the county. A supplementary list includes four additional sites that were formerly on the National Register.

This National Park Service list is complete through NPS recent listings posted April 17, 2026.

== Current listings ==
	Name on the Register	Image	Date listed	Location	City or town	Description
1	J.A. Anderson House	J.A. Anderson House	August 11, 1980 (#80002132)	402 4th Ave. 44°13′44″N 95°16′06″W	Lamberton	Redwood County's most prominent example of a Queen Anne house, built circa 1900.
2	Bank of Redwood Falls Building	Bank of Redwood Falls Building	August 11, 1980 (#80002141)	105 E. 2nd St. 44°32′26″N 95°07′09″W	Redwood Falls	Small bank building constructed circa 1885, significant for the integrity of its outsized Richardsonian Romanesque features on the Redwood Falls streetscape.
3	Birch Coulee School	Birch Coulee School	April 12, 1990 (#90000554)	Off County Highway 2, south of Morton; 44°32′01″N 94°59′49″W	Morton vicinity	Schoolhouse active 1891–1920 on the Lower Sioux Indian Reservation, a reminder of federal efforts at cultural assimilation of Native Americans through formal education. The earliest and best preserved of Minnesota's surviving Native American education facilities.
4	Chicago and North Western Railroad Depot	Chicago and North Western Railroad Depot	August 11, 1980 (#80002135)	1st St. 44°24′39″N 95°24′35″W	Lucan	1902 railway station symbolizing the key role of railroads in the area's agricultural development and the siting of its towns.
5	H.D. Chollar House	H.D. Chollar House	August 11, 1980 (#80002142)	4th and Minnesota Sts. 44°32′20″N 95°07′15″W	Redwood Falls	Redwood Falls' only Italianate house, built c. 1878. Also noted for its owner's association with the local railside lumber yard, an important early business in most area towns.
6	City Blacksmith Shop	City Blacksmith Shop	August 11, 1980 (#80002133)	Douglas St. and 2nd Ave. 44°13′51″N 95°15′55″W	Lamberton	c. 1898 blacksmith shop with much of its original equipment, a leading example of a key service in many of the area's communities catering to the agricultural sector. Now managed by the Lamberton Area Historical Society.
7	Clements State Bank Building	Clements State Bank Building	August 11, 1980 (#80002130)	1st and Pine Sts. 44°22′50″N 95°03′11″W	Clements	1902 bank building—founded, like the Milroy State Bank Building, by businessmen from Springfield, Minnesota—representing the commercial investment of outsiders in a string of towns platted on a new railroad line.
8	District No. 8 School	District No. 8 School	August 11, 1980 (#80002131)	23349 County Road 70; 44°23′24″N 95°09′06″W	Clements vicinity	1908 example of Redwood County's rural schoolhouses, particularly notable for the retention of its original outbuildings (a barn and outhouse).
9	Gilfillan	Gilfillan	August 11, 1980 (#80002143)	28263 Minnesota Highway 67; 44°27′46″N 94°59′40″W	Redwood Falls vicinity	1882 farm of Charles Duncan Gilfillan (1831–1902) and his son (1872–1962), significant for their role in developing St. Paul and Redwood County, and their promotion of progressive farming in southwest Minnesota. The large farmstead is also associated with the alienation of seized Dakota reservation land. Now managed by the Redwood County Historical Society.
10	Gimmestad Land and Loan Office	Gimmestad Land and Loan Office	August 11, 1980 (#80002128)	Main St. 44°36′21″N 95°19′47″W	Belview	Rare intact example of an early office building—built in 1892—and a representative of the once-common land and loan offices that promoted small town commerce.
11	Honner-Hosken House	Honner-Hosken House	August 11, 1980 (#80002138)	North and Main Sts. 44°33′52″N 95°05′41″W	North Redwood	1872 home of notable settler J.S.G. Honner (d. 1888) and later Thomas Hosken (d. 1929), Honner's successor in a locally important quarrying operation.
12	Lower Sioux Agency	Lower Sioux Agency	September 22, 1970 (#70000308)	32469 County Road 2; 44°31′34″N 94°57′28″W	Morton	Site of the 1853 federal administrative center for the Lower Sioux Indian Reservation, destroyed at the outbreak of the Dakota War of 1862. Now a state/tribal museum containing a restored 1861 stone warehouse. A boundary increase was approved August 29, 2025.
13	Milroy State Bank Building	Milroy State Bank Building	August 11, 1980 (#80002137)	Superior St. and Euclid Ave. 44°25′08″N 95°33′14″W	Milroy	1902 bank building—founded, like the Clements State Bank Building, by businessmen from Springfield, Minnesota—representing the commercial investment of outsiders in a string of towns platted on a new railroad line.
14	Minneapolis and St. Louis Railroad Depot	Minneapolis and St. Louis Railroad Depot	August 11, 1980 (#80002129)	Off Main St. 44°36′26″N 95°19′48″W	Belview	1892 railway station symbolizing the key role of railroads in the area's agricultural development and the siting of its towns.
15	Odeon Theater	Odeon Theater	August 30, 1974 (#74001041)	Main St. 44°36′16″N 95°19′45″W	Belview	Well-preserved example of a rural theater hall, built in 1901, with simplified Queen Anne architecture.
16	Ramsey Park Swayback Bridge	Ramsey Park Swayback Bridge	August 11, 1980 (#80002144)	Ramsey Park; 44°33′03″N 95°07′30″W	Redwood Falls	Unique park bridge built by the Works Progress Administration in 1938.
17	Redwood Falls Carnegie Library	Redwood Falls Carnegie Library	August 11, 1980 (#80002139)	334 S. Jefferson St. 44°32′20″N 95°07′00″W	Redwood Falls	1904 Carnegie library, significant for having the most intact exterior of Redwood County's early educational buildings.
18	Redwood Falls Retaining Wall Roadside Development Project	Redwood Falls Retaining Wall Roadside Development Project	July 25, 2012 (#12000429)	Junction of MN 19 & US 71; 44°32′28″N 95°07′13″W	Redwood Falls	Exemplary early roadside development built 1934–36 by the Minnesota Department of Highways to increase safety and aesthetics along the developing state highway system.
19	Revere Fire Hall	Revere Fire Hall	August 11, 1980 (#80002145)	2nd St. 44°13′21″N 95°21′55″W	Revere	Fire station built c. 1900, representative of common, specialized municipal buildings.
20	St. Cornelia's Episcopal Church	St. Cornelia's Episcopal Church	October 11, 1979 (#79003717)	38378 Reservation Hwy 101; 44°32′00″N 94°59′43″W	Morton vicinity	Church built 1889–91 for a returning Dakota congregation after years of exile from Minnesota following the Dakota War of 1862. Also an example of the Episcopal missionary work among Native Americans and fine Gothic Revival church construction under Bishop Henry Benjamin Whipple.
21	Scenic City Cooperative Oil Company	Scenic City Cooperative Oil Company	August 11, 1980 (#80002140)	2nd and Mill Sts. 44°32′25″N 95°07′09″W	Redwood Falls	Distinctive service station built c. 1925, dating to the advent of widespread automobile use in Redwood County.
22	Walnut Grove Creamery Association	Walnut Grove Creamery Association	July 12, 2006 (#06000602)	521 Main St. 44°13′22″N 95°28′09″W	Walnut Grove	1930 cooperative milk-processing facility, a well-preserved example of the small early-20th-century creameries serving the region's dairy farming industry.

== Former listings ==
	Name on the Register	Image	Date listed	Date removed	Location	City or town	Description
1	Commercial Hotel	Commercial Hotel	August 11, 1980 (#80002146)	January 31, 2019	Front and Main Sts.	Wabasso	1901 example of a privately funded, frame hotel serving a small-town railroad junction. Demolished circa 2010.
2	Delhi Coronet Band Hall		May 17, 1984 (#84001687)	November 1, 2018	3rd St.	Delhi	1896 community band hall significant as the venue for many political and social events in Delhi Township's development. Demolished in 2007.
3	Lamberton Farmers Elevator		August 11, 1980 (#80002134)	February 13, 1991	1st Ave. and Douglas St.	Lamberton	Unusual brick grain elevator built in 1916. Fell into disrepair and demolished by the city in 1989.
4	Milroy Block		August 11, 1980 (#80002136)	August 2, 2000	Euclid Ave. and Cherry St.	Milroy	1902 Italianate commercial building. Demolished in 1998.

== See also ==
- List of National Historic Landmarks in Minnesota
- National Register of Historic Places listings in Minnesota
