= Fire Hall =

Fire Hall or Firemen's Hall or variations may refer to:

in the United States

- Firemen's Hall (Cannon Falls, Minnesota), listed on the National Register of Historic Places (NRHP)
- Revere Fire Hall, Revere, Minnesota, NRHP-listed
- Fire Hall (Joliet, Montana), NRHP-listed in Carbon County
- Fireman's Hall (Alfred, New York), NRHP-listed
- Firemen's Hall (College Point, New York), NRHP-listed in Queens County, within New York City
- Fire Hall (Bismarck, North Dakota), formerly NRHP-listed in Burleigh County

== See also ==
- List of fire stations
