= Gary Dahms =

American politician

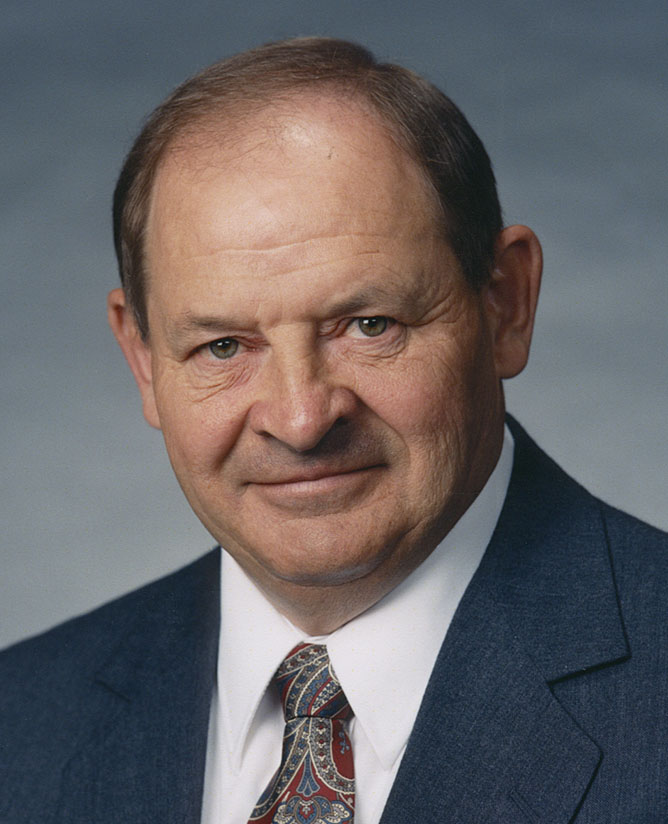

Member of the Minnesota Senate from the 15th district 21st (2011–2012), 16th (2013 - 2022)
- Incumbent
- Assumed office January 4, 2011
- Preceded by: Dennis R. Frederickson
- Succeeded by: Braxton Seifert (elect)

Personal details
- Born: January 14, 1947 (age 79) Clements, Minnesota
- Party: Republican Party of Minnesota
- Spouse: Barb
- Children: 2
- Education: University of Minnesota
- Occupation: car dealer, insurance agent, legislator

Gary H. Dahms (/deɪmz/ DAYMZ; born January 14, 1947) is a Minnesota politician and member of the Minnesota Senate. A member of the Republican Party of Minnesota, he represents District 15, which includes all or portions of Brown, Lac qui Parle, Lyon, Redwood, Renville, and Yellow Medicine counties in the southwestern part of the state.

== Early life, education, and career ==
Dahms graduated from Redwood Falls High School in 1965, then attended the University of Minnesota, graduating with a B.S. in agricultural business administration.

Dahms is the former owner of Riverside Motors and American Family Insurance Agency in Redwood Falls. He most recently served as a Redwood County Commissioner, and was also a board member of the Redwood County Soil and Water Conservation District, the Redwood County Agricultural Society, the Redwood Area Development Corporation, the Redwood County Economic Development Association, the Southwest Minnesota Regional Development Commission, the Minnesota Valley Rail Authority, and the Redwood–Renville Health Services Board.

== Minnesota Senate ==
Dahms was first elected in 2010, succeeding retiring longtime Senator Dennis Frederickson of New Ulm. He has been reelected four times since then.

Dahms is notable for his opposition to breweries and distilleries. In April 2015, he voted against a popular bill to repeal the longstanding ban on Sunday liquor sales. During the COVID-19 pandemic, when Dahms chaired the Commerce Committee, a number of colleagues said he was a main roadblock to a bill that would have allowed craft breweries to sell package sizes other than 750ml and 64oz.
