= Redwood River =

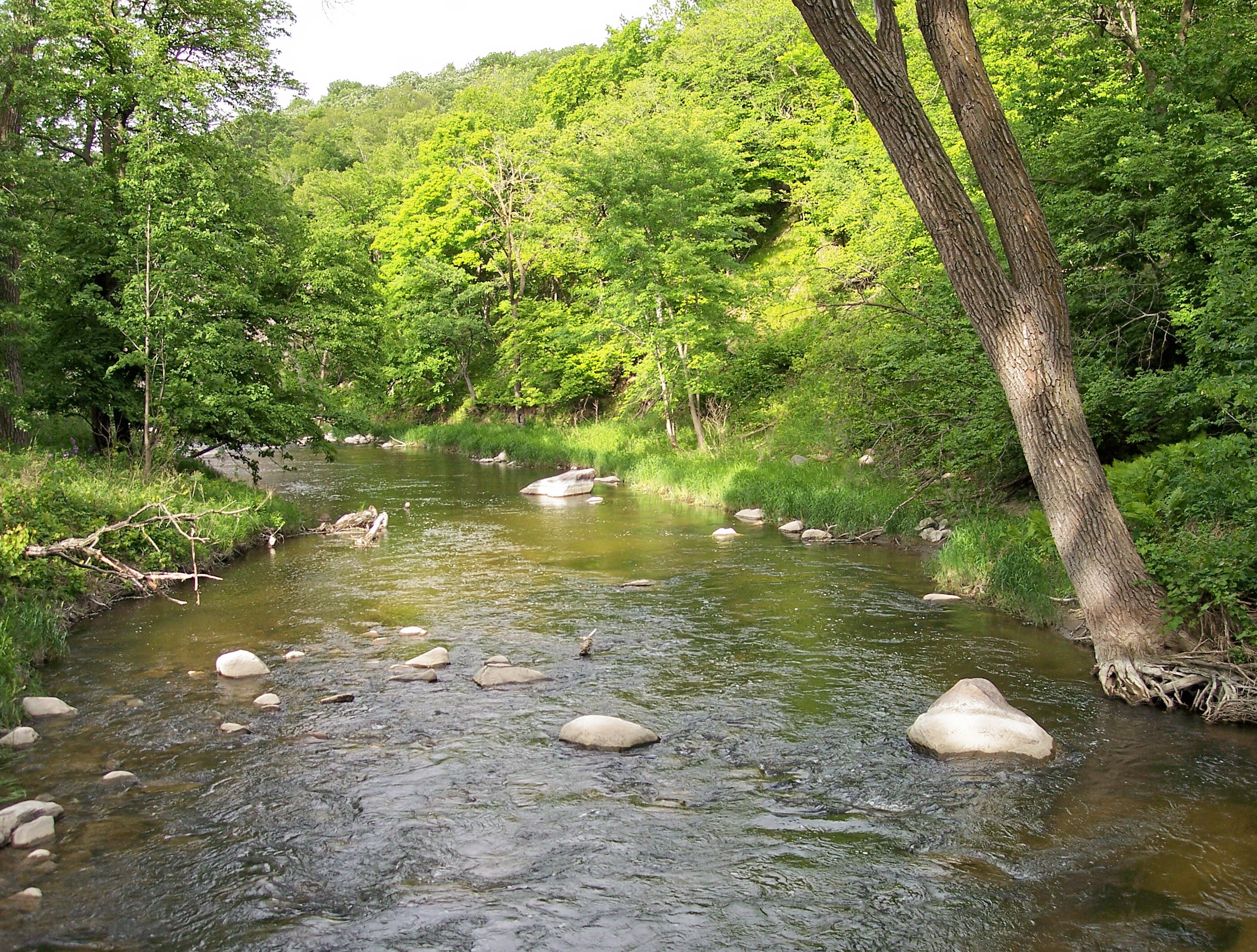
- The Redwood River in Camden State Park in 2007

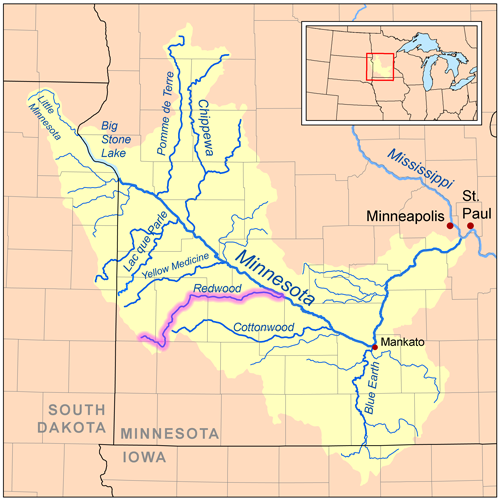

Location
- Country: United States
- State: Minnesota

Physical characteristics
- Source
  - location: Aetna Township, Pipestone County
  - coordinates: 44°10′03″N 96°10′18″W
  - elevation: 1,909 ft (582 m)
- Mouth: Minnesota River
  - location: near Redwood Falls, Redwood County
  - coordinates: 44°34′16″N 95°05′18″W
  - elevation: 827 ft (252 m)
- Length: 127.1 mi (204.5 km)
- Basin size: 705 sq mi (1,830 km^{2})
- Discharge
  - location: near Redwood Falls
  - average: 153 cu ft/s (4.3 m^{3}/s)
  - minimum: 0 cu ft/s (0 m^{3}/s)
  - maximum: 19,700 cu ft/s (560 m^{3}/s)
- Discharge
  - location: near Marshall
  - average: 69.5 cu ft/s (1.97 m^{3}/s)

The Redwood River is a tributary of the Minnesota River, 127 miles (204 km) long, in southwestern Minnesota in the United States. Via the Minnesota River, it is part of the watershed of the Mississippi River, draining an area of 705 square miles (1,830 km^{2}) in an agricultural region. The river's name is believed to refer to the reddish bark of dogwood growing along streams in the region.

== Course ==
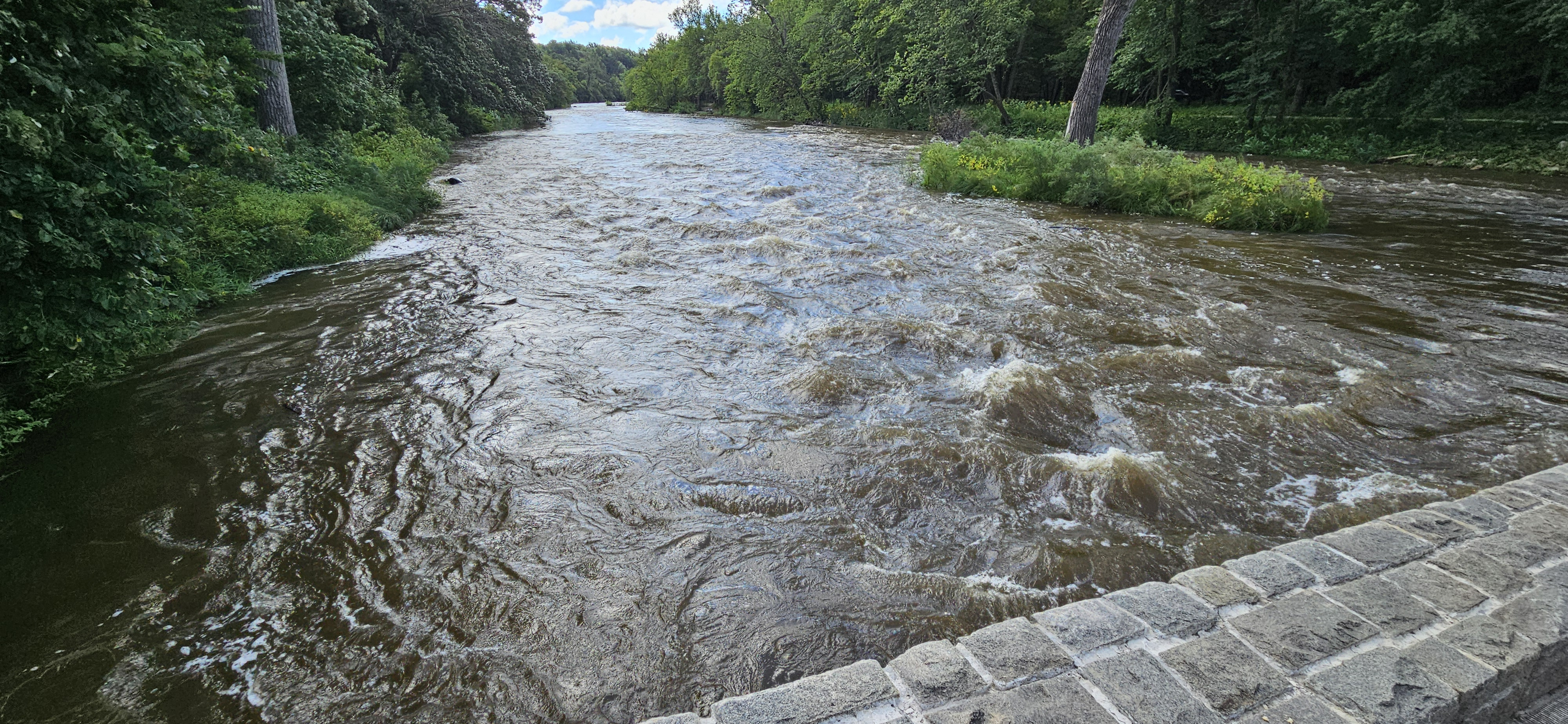
High water level at Alexander Ramsey Park near Redwood Falls

.

The headwaters of the Redwood River are in Aetna Township in northeastern Pipestone County, approximately four miles (6.4 km) west of Ruthton, on the Coteau des Prairies, a morainic plateau dividing the Mississippi and Missouri River watersheds. It flows initially eastwardly as an intermittent stream, through Ruthton and into northwestern Murray County, then northwardly into Lyon County, where it turns northeastward and flows through Russell, Lynd, and Marshall. Between Russell and Marshall, the river flows off the Coteau in a wooded valley, dropping 300 feet (91 m) in 15 miles (24 km); Camden State Park is located along this stretch of the river.

Downstream of Marshall, the Redwood flows through a flat till plain and turns eastward into Redwood County, passing Vesta and Seaforth; sections of the river in this stretch have been straightened to form agricultural ditches. In Redwood Falls, the county seat of Redwood County, the river enters the wooded valley of the Minnesota River, falling 100 feet (30 m) in one mile (1.6 km) over granite ledges in Alexander Ramsey City Park. It flows into the Minnesota shortly downstream of the city.

A dam forming Redwood Lake in Redwood Falls was formerly used for hydroelectricity generation. It is presently maintained to preserve the lake for recreational use.

Principal tributaries of the Redwood River include Coon Creek, 37 miles (60 km) long, which flows from Lake Benton in Lincoln County westwardly to Russell in Lyon County; Three Mile Creek, 50 miles (80 km) long, which rises in Lincoln County and flows northeastwardly and southeastwardly through Lyon County, joining the Redwood downstream of Marshall; and Ramsey Creek, 10 miles (16 km) long, which flows over a waterfall in Ramsey City Park in Redwood Falls.

Approximately 82% of the land in the Redwood River watershed is used for agriculture, primarily for the cultivation of corn and soybeans. Hundreds of miles of streams in the watershed have been converted to agricultural ditches, disrupting habitat and reducing the ability of the land to absorb flooding.

== Flow rate ==
At the United States Geological Survey's stream gauge near Redwood Falls, 8.5 miles (13.7 km) upstream from the river's mouth, the annual mean flow of the river between 1909 and 2005 was 153 cubic feet per second (4 m^{3}/s). The highest recorded flow during the period was 19,700 ft^{3}/s (558 m^{3}/s) on June 18, 1957. Readings of zero were recorded on numerous days in 1940 and 1959.

At an upstream gauge near Marshall, the annual mean flow between 1940 and 2005 was 69.5 ft^{3}/s (2 m^{3}/s). The highest recorded flow during the period was 6,380 ft^{3}/s (181 m^{3}/s) on May 9, 1993. Readings of zero were recorded on numerous days during several years.

== See also ==
- List of rivers in Minnesota
- List of Minnesota placenames of Native American origin
