= Camden Park =

Camden Park is the name of several locations:

== Australia ==
- Camden Park, New South Wales, Australia, an outer suburb of Sydney, near Camden
- Camden Park Estate, New South Wales, Australia, a property owned by John Macarthur, near Camden
- Camden Park, South Australia, a suburb of Adelaide

== United Kingdom ==
- Camden Park, London, England

== United States ==
- Camden Park (amusement park) an amusement park near Huntington, West Virginia
- Camden State Park, Minnesota
- Oriole Park at Camden Yards, a baseball stadium located in Baltimore, Maryland
