= Milroy State Bank Building =

- U.S. National Register of Historic Places
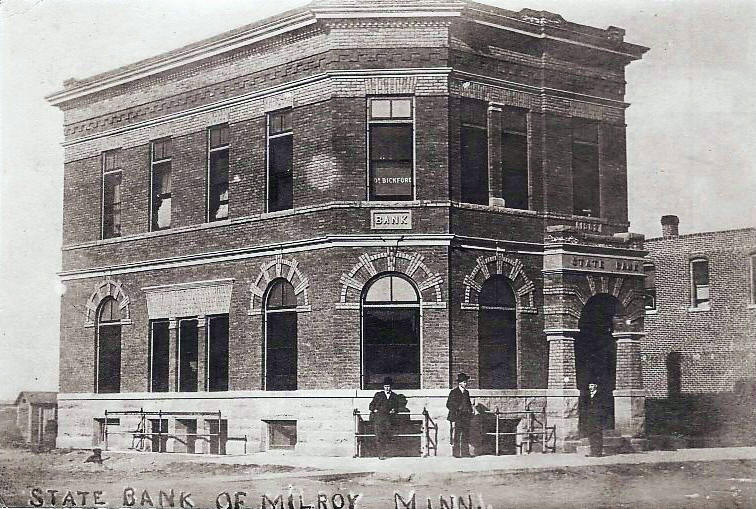
- Milroy State Bank Building in 1909

- Location within Minnesota Location within the United States
- Location: 501 Euclid Street; Milroy, Minnesota 56263
- Coordinates: 44°25′08″N 95°33′14″W
- Built: 1902
- Architectural style: Queen Anne, Richardsonian
- NRHP reference No.: 80002137
- Added to NRHP: August 11, 1980

The Milroy State Bank Building is located in the city of Milroy, Minnesota at the intersection of Superior Street and Euclid Avenue (Minnesota State Highway 68). The building was a former community bank built in 1902 by a group of businessmen from Springfield, Minnesota. It is nearly identical to the Clements State Bank Building in Clements, Minnesota representing the commercial investment of outsiders in a string of towns platted on a new railroad line, the Minnesota Western Branch of Chicago and North Western Railway.

The bank closed in 1930 and afterwards the building was used for several purposes, including a doctor’s office, and a bank exchange. It was the post office of Milroy from 1951 until 1989 when a new post office was built in its replacement. On August 11, 1980, the building was listed on the National Register of Historic Places along with several other buildings in Redwood County, Minnesota.

After being unused and abandoned when the post office moved out, it sat in decay for many years, remaining unheated and the roof had partially collapsed. In 2009, a local resident, Sunny Ruthchild, purchased the building for around $1,000 and renovated it and converted it to modern apartments. The renovation included improvements to the roof, restoration of the floors, and the installation of high-efficiency windows along with a geothermal heat pump. The upper part of the building is currently leased as an apartment and the lower part currently sits empty with plans to turn it into a small business such as a bakery or café.

== See also ==
- National Register of Historic Places listings in Redwood County, Minnesota
