= St. Cornelia's Episcopal Church =

Historic church in Minnesota, United States

- U.S. National Register of Historic Places
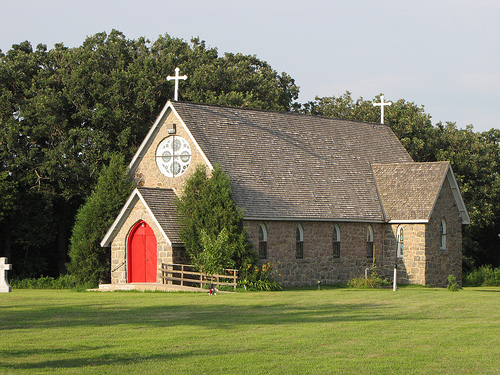
- St. Cornelia's Episcopal Church from the southwest

- Location within Minnesota Location within the United States
- Location: 38378 Reservation Highway 101, Morton, Minnesota
- Coordinates: 44°32′0″N 94°59′43″W
- Area: 9.1 acres (3.7 ha)
- Built: 1889–91
- Architectural style: Gothic Revival
- NRHP reference No.: 79003717
- Added to NRHP: October 11, 1979

St. Cornelia's Episcopal Church is a historic church on the Lower Sioux Indian Reservation near Morton, Minnesota, United States. It was built 1889–91 for a Dakota congregation returning after years of exile from Minnesota following the Dakota War of 1862. It is also an example of the Episcopal missionary work among Native Americans and fine Gothic Revival church construction under Bishop Henry Benjamin Whipple (1822–1901). St. Cornelia's was added to the National Register of Historic Places in 1979. It was listed for having state-level significance in architecture, exploration/settlement, and religion.

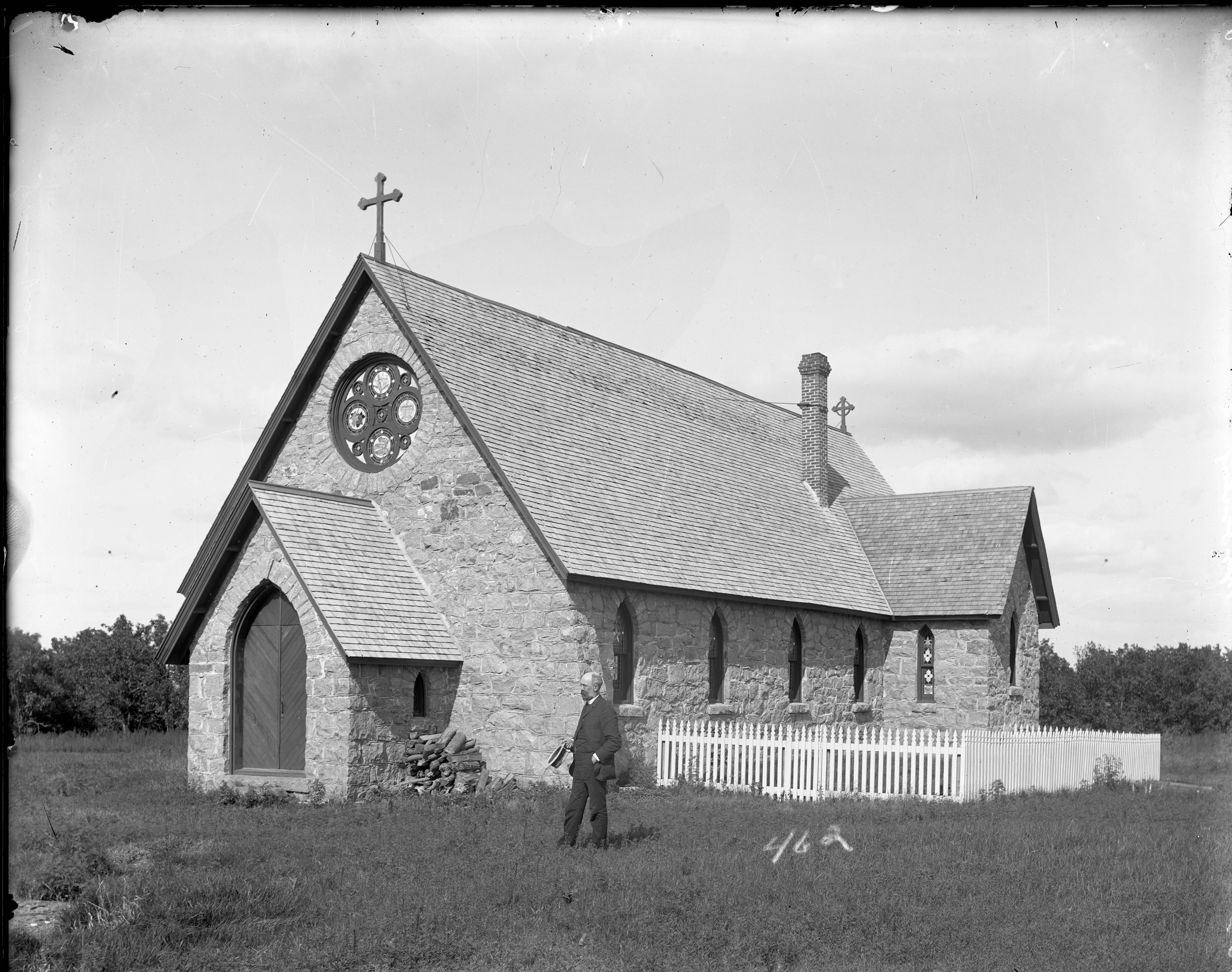
Reverend Knowles in front of St. Cornelia's Episcopal Church

== See also ==
- National Register of Historic Places listings in Redwood County, Minnesota
