= Alexander Ramsey Park =

- Little Yellowstone of Minnesota
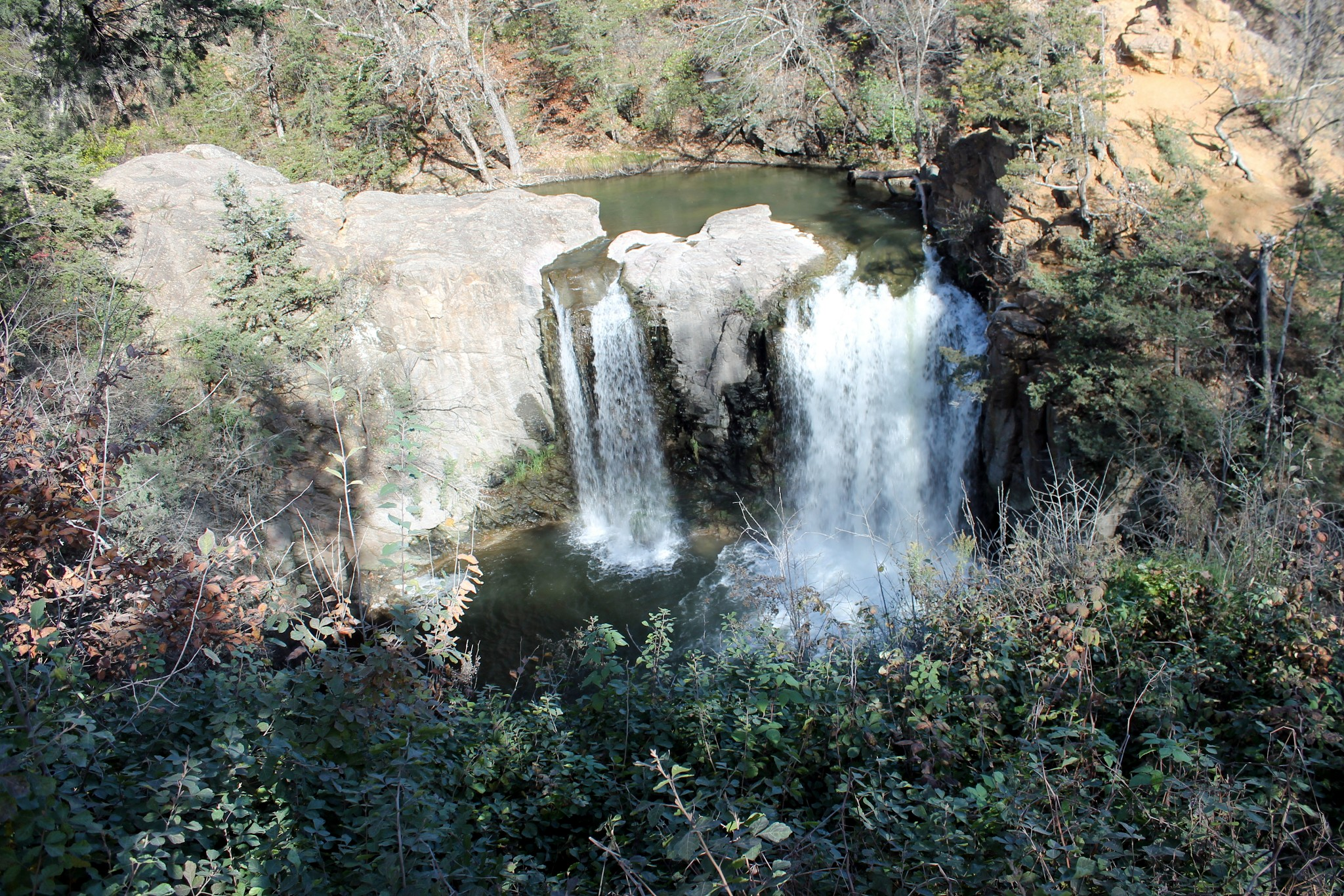
- Interactive map of Alexander Ramsey Park
- Type: Municipal park
- Location: Redwood Falls, Minnesota
- Coordinates: 44°33′00″N 95°07′30″W
- Area: 256 acres (104 ha)
- Opened: 1911 (State Park); 1957 (Municipal)
- Operator: City of Redwood Falls
- Status: Open year-round
- Facilities: Campground, zoo, hiking trails, shelters
- Website: Official website

Alexander Ramsey Park is a municipal park located in Redwood Falls, Minnesota, United States. Covering approximately 256 acres, it is the largest municipal park in Minnesota. It is often referred to as the "Little Yellowstone of Minnesota". The park features a zoo and a campground, along with several picnic structures, including those built by the Civilian Conservation Corps in the 1930s. The park is also known to the Dakota people as Cansayapi, meaning "the place where they paint the trees red," referring to the practice of marking trees as landmarks for travelers.

== History ==
- Ramsey Park Swayback Bridge
- U.S. National Register of Historic Places
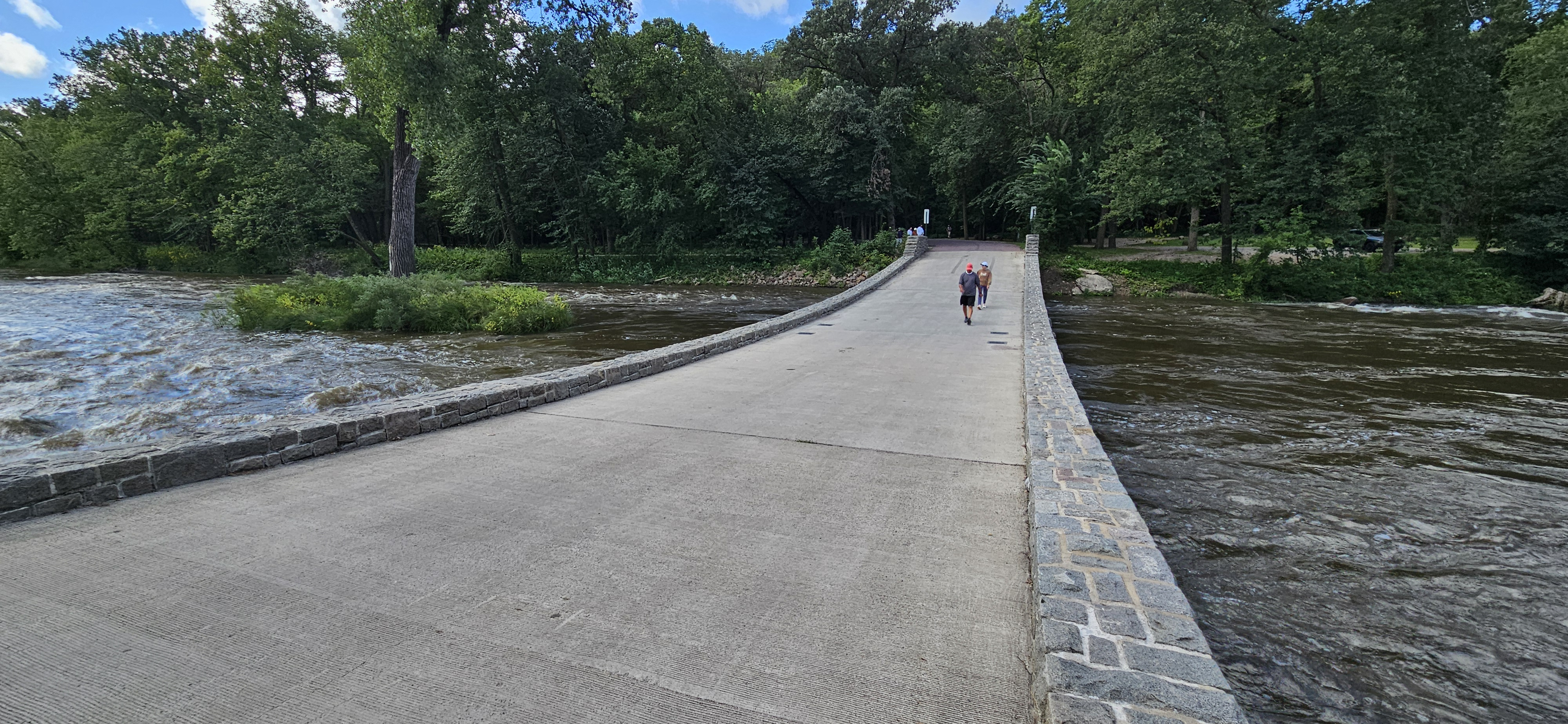
- The historic Swayback Bridge at Ramsey Park.

- Location within Minnesota
- Location: Ramsey Park, Redwood Falls, Minnesota
- Coordinates: 44°33′02″N 95°07′28″W
- Built: 1938
- Built by: Works Progress Administration
- Architectural style: Swayback bridge
- MPS: Redwood County MRA
- NRHP reference No.: 80002144
- Added to NRHP: August 11, 1980

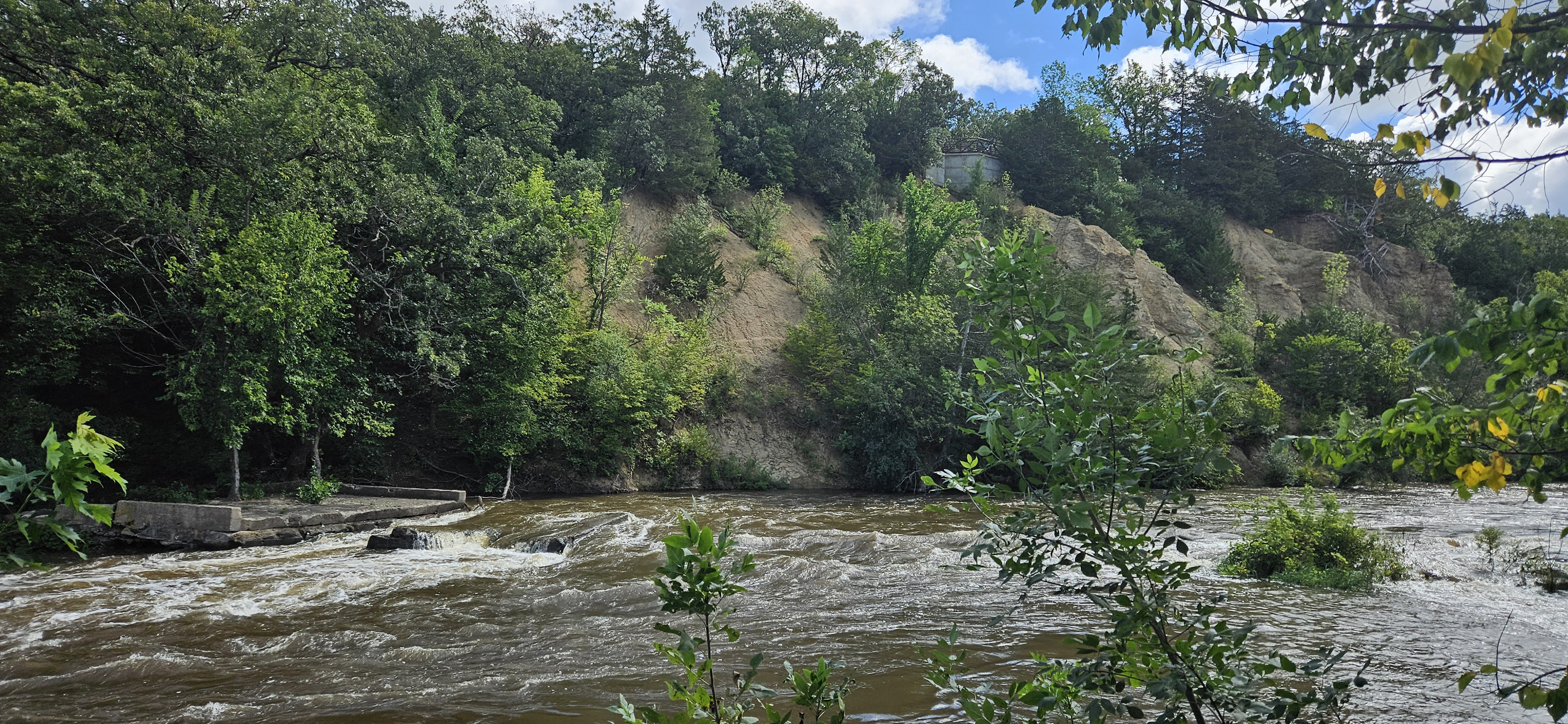
The site of a bridge that once existed over the Redwood River in Ramsey Park.

Originally established as a state park by the Minnesota Legislature in 1911, it was named in honor of Alexander Ramsey, who was the first governor of the Minnesota Territory. The park was transferred to the city of Redwood Falls in 1957 for one dollar. The city continues to operate it.

The Redwood River flows through the heart of the park, creating a series of cascades including the centerpiece, Ramsey Falls. The river runs through a deep granite gorge, and can be viewed via several trails. The river is prone to flooding at the park and has caused damage in the past.

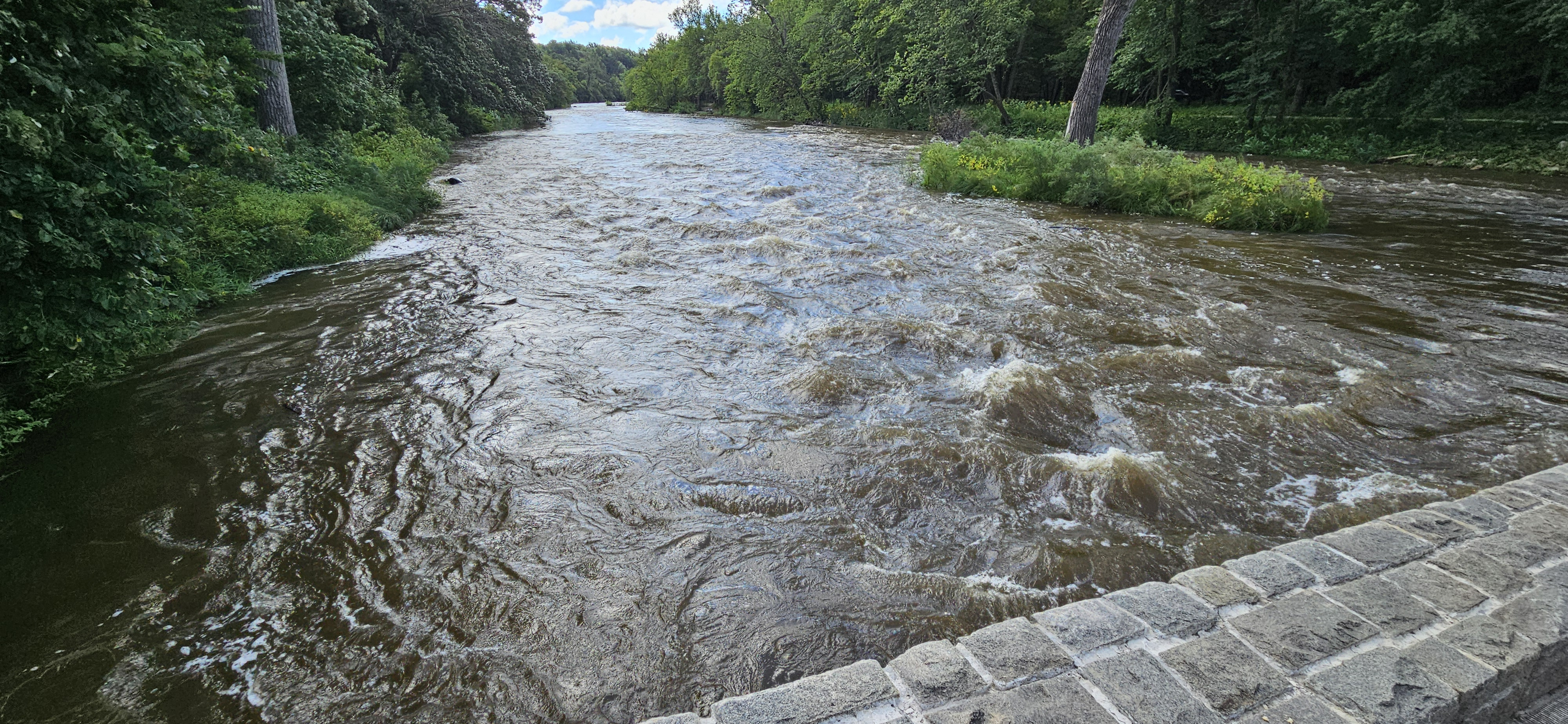
High water level at Ramsey Park near Redwood Falls.

In 1902, August Burmeister utilized this descent to build a dam and hydroelectricity facility, which was among the first in the state. The most significant flood on record occurred in June 1957, when the river reached a discharge of 19,700 cubic feet per second, destroying several park structures.

== Structures ==
Several structures were constructed by the Works Progress Administration and Civilian Conservation Corps. The most famous of these structures is the swayback bridge over the Redwood River. The Swayback Bridge is a granite-faced bridge built in 1938 that is listed on the National Register of Historic Places. The bridge carries East Oak Street, also known as County Road 31. Redwood County renovated the bridge in 2013 due to flood damage. Other historic features include the massive stone Lower Shelter and the remnants of the Burmeister Mill.

The park contains a zoo, located near the main entrance. It features several species native to the region, including bison, elk, white-tailed deer, and Prairie dogs. Several bird species are also at the zoo, along with goats, and it is open year-round.

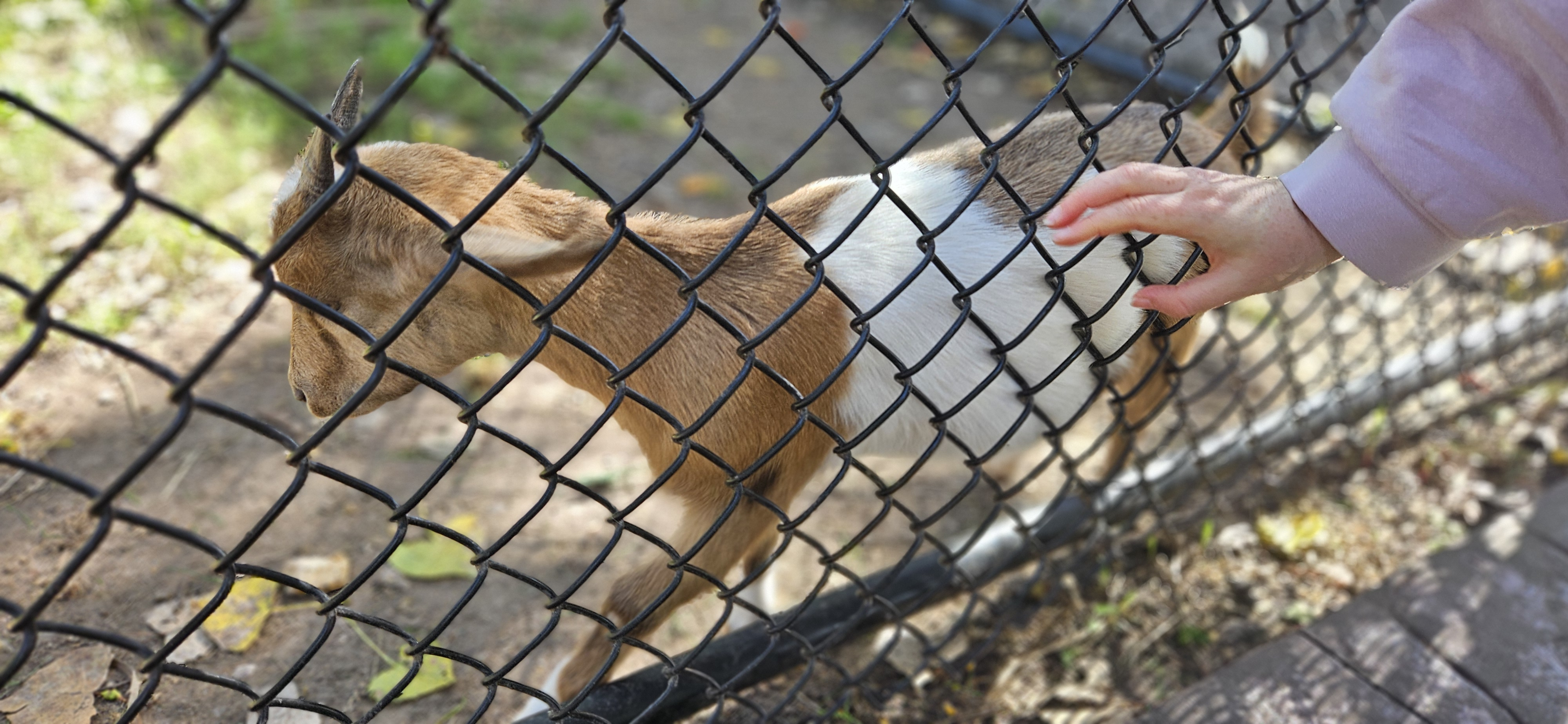
A goat at the Ramsey Park Zoo.

== Geocaching ==
The park contains many geocaches, and the City of Redwood Falls encourages the activity in the park. Most geocaches are located along trails throughout the southwestern portion of the park; there are several different types available to find.
