= Milroy, Minnesota =

City in Minnesota, United States

Milroy
- City
- Cities and townships of Redwood County
- Coordinates: 44°25′5″N 95°33′12″W
- Country: United States
- State: Minnesota
- County: Redwood

Government
  - Type: Mayor—Council
  - Mayor: Megan Weber

Area
  - Total: 0.26 sq mi (0.68 km^{2})
  - Land: 0.26 sq mi (0.68 km^{2})
  - Water: 0 sq mi (0.00 km^{2})
- Elevation: 1,109 ft (338 m)

Population (2020)
  - Total: 259
  - Density: 992.3/sq mi (383.11/km^{2})
- Time zone: UTC-6 (Central (CST))
  - Summer (DST): UTC-5 (CDT)
- ZIP code: 56263
- Area code: 507
- FIPS code: 27-42362
- GNIS feature ID: 0647895
- Website: https://milroy.municipalimpact.com/

Milroy is a city in Redwood County, Minnesota, United States. The population was 259 at the 2020 census. It is named after Robert H. Milroy, a Union Army general in the American Civil War.

== Geography ==
According to the United States Census Bureau, the city has a total area of 0.26 square miles (0.67 km^{2}), all land.

Milroy is located along Minnesota Highway 68. It is the westernmost city in Redwood County, located 13 miles from Marshall and 30 miles from Redwood Falls.

== History ==
Milroy was platted in 1902, and named for Robert H. Milroy, a Union Army general in the American Civil War. A post office has been in operation at Milroy since 1902. Milroy was incorporated in 1902.

== Demographics ==
Historical population
Census	Pop.	Note	%±
1910	137		—
1920	177		29.2%
1930	157		−11.3%
1940	261		66.2%
1950	268		2.7%
1960	268		0.0%
1970	247		−7.8%
1980	242		−2.0%
1990	297		22.7%
2000	271		−8.8%
2010	251		−7.4%
2020	259		3.2%
U.S. Decennial Census; 2013 Estimate

=== 2010 census ===
As of the census of 2010, there were 252 people, 114 households, and 66 families living in the city. The population density was 969.2 inhabitants per square mile (374.2/km^{2}). There were 127 housing units at an average density of 488.5 per square mile (188.6/km^{2}). The racial makeup of the city was 98.4% White, 1.2% Asian, and 0.4% from two or more races. Hispanic or Latino of any race were 0.8% of the population.

There were 114 households, of which 24.6% had children under the age of 18 living with them, 50.0% were married couples living together, 0.9% had a female householder with no husband present, 7.0% had a male householder with no wife present, and 42.1% were non-families. 36.8% of all households were made up of individuals, and 5.3% had someone living alone who was 65 years of age or older. The average household size was 2.21 and the average family size was 2.92.

The median age in the city was 37 years. 23.4% of residents were under the age of 18; 9.1% were between the ages of 18 and 24; 28.4% were from 25 to 44; 26.9% were from 45 to 64; and 11.9% were 65 years of age or older. The gender makeup of the city was 51.2% male and 48.8% female.

=== 2000 census ===
As of the census of 2000, there were 271 people, 119 households, and 76 families living in the city. The population density was 1,066.0 inhabitants per square mile (411.6/km^{2}). There were 132 housing units at an average density of 519.2 per square mile (200.5/km^{2}). The racial makeup of the city was 97.42% White, 0.74% Native American, 0.74% Asian, and 1.11% from other races. Hispanic or Latino of any race were 1.85% of the population.

There were 119 households, out of which 28.6% had children under the age of 18 living with them, 45.4% were married couples living together, 12.6% had a female householder with no husband present, and 36.1% were non-families. 33.6% of all households were made up of individuals, and 11.8% had someone living alone who was 65 years of age or older. The average household size was 2.28 and the average family size was 2.87.

In the city, the population was spread out, with 26.9% under the age of 18, 6.3% from 18 to 24, 26.2% from 25 to 44, 23.2% from 45 to 64, and 17.3% who were 65 years of age or older. The median age was 40 years. For every 100 females, there were 122.1 males. For every 100 females age 18 and over, there were 104.1 males.

The median income for a household in the city was $33,625, and the median income for a family was $36,042. Males had a median income of $29,722 versus $18,750 for females. The per capita income for the city was $16,866. About 5.2% of families and 9.3% of the population were below the poverty line, including 22.4% of those under the age of eighteen and none of those 65 or over.

== Notable people ==
- Norman R. DeBlieck (1926-2021), farmer and Minnesota state legislator
- Edwin W. Rawlings (1904–1997) – Born in Milroy, he served in the United States Air Force from 1929 to 1959, rising to the rank of four-star general; after his retirement from military service, he went on to become president and board chairman of General Mills, based in Golden Valley, Minnesota.

== See also ==
Milroy State Bank Building
