= Braxton Seifert =

American politician

Member-elect of the Minnesota Senate from the 15th district
- Assuming office January 2027
- Succeeding: Gary Dahms

Personal details
- Party: Republican

Braxton Seifert is an American politician. A member of the Republican Party, he is the member-elect for the 15th district of the Minnesota Senate.
