= Edwin W. Rawlings =

United States Air Force general

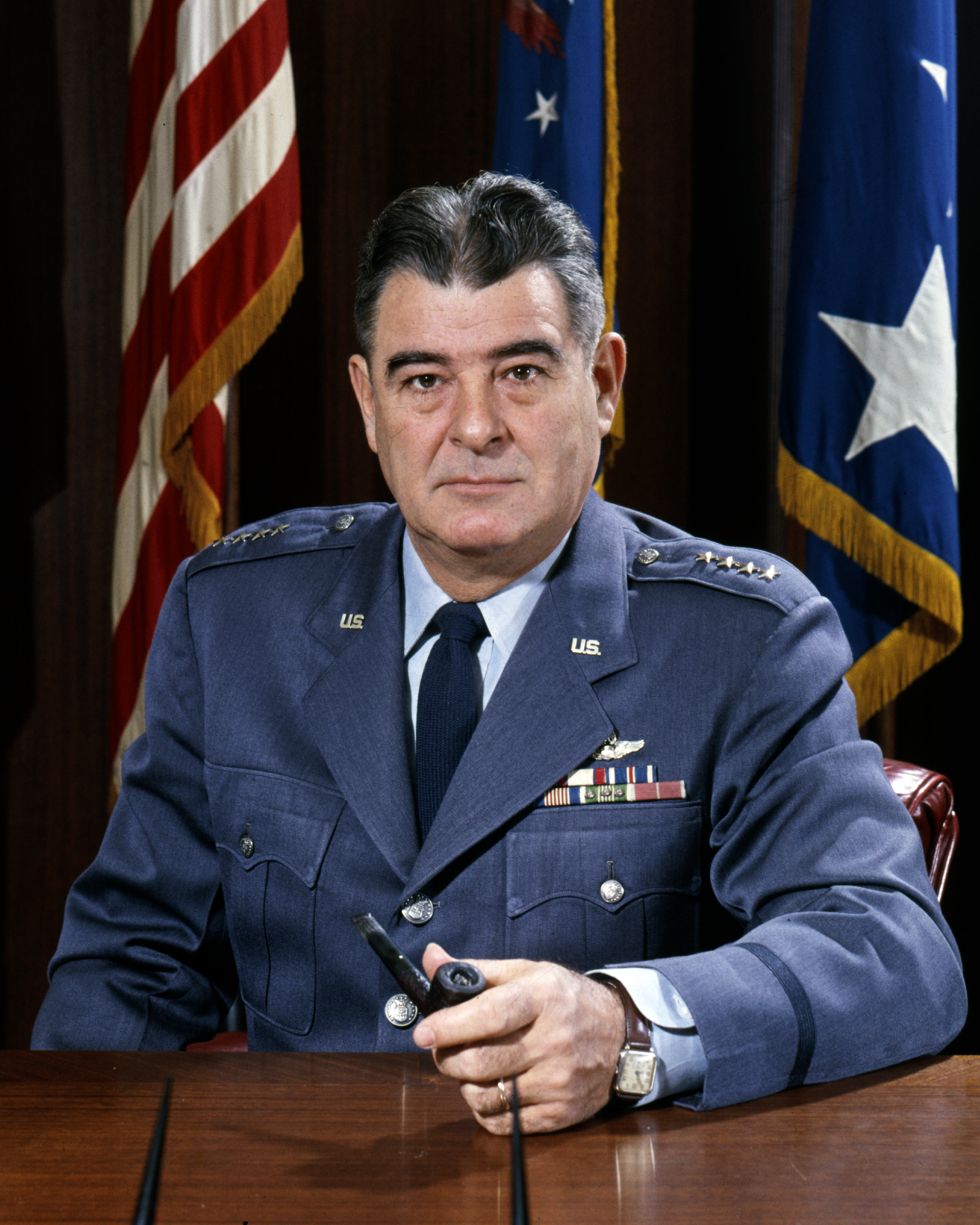
- General Edwin W. Rawlings
- Born: September 11, 1904; Milroy, Minnesota
- Died: December 8, 1997 (aged 93); Auburn, Washington
- Military career
- Allegiance: United States of America
- Branch: United States Air Force
- Service years: 1929–1959
- Rank: General
- Commands: Air Materiel Command
- Conflicts: World War II
- Awards: Distinguished Flying Cross; Soldier's Medal
- Other work: President, General Mills

General Edwin William Rawlings, USAF (Ret), (September 11, 1904 – December 8, 1997) was a leading figure in the administrative development of the United States Air Force (USAF).

== Early life ==
A Milroy, Minnesota native, Rawlings graduated with an economics degree from Hamline University in Saint Paul, Minnesota. He became a flying cadet in February 1929. Almost 25 years to the day later, he became one of the USAF's youngest generals, confirmed for a fourth star at 49. He had also by then earned an MBA from Harvard University.

== Air comptroller pioneer ==
In November 1946, Symington named Rawlings as air comptroller, helping to organize the office. The position was so successful and struck such a note, the United States adopted the idea of a comptroller for all three services.

In 1951, Rawlings became commander of Air Materiel Command at Wright-Patterson AFB, Ohio, leading USAF's procurement and logistics efforts for seven years. Air Force Chief of Staff Thomas D. White credited him with spectacular increases in the effectiveness of the Air Force logistics, accomplished through new management methods, concepts, and philosophy, and thus the Air Force has been able to match the tempo of the jet, missile, and space era.

Rawlings was a command pilot and combat and aircraft observer, whose decorations included the Distinguished Service Medal and Distinguished Flying Cross, which he received in 1930 for his role in the rescue of an aircrew downed in the Pacific. He also received the Soldier's Medal in 1954 for rescuing his pilot who was lying underneath a B-17 Flying Fortress that caught fire after landing at Wright-Patterson.

== Later life ==
After retiring from USAF in 1959, he went on to a career with General Mills, rising to become president and board chairman. During his second career, General Rawlings introduced corporate social responsibility and adapted the Delphi method for corporate strategic planning.

In 1997, Rawlings died in Auburn, Washington at age 93.

== Legacy ==
In 1981 the Air Force Association (AFA) and AEF in 1981 established the Gen.. Edwin W. Rawlings Award initially to recognize energy conservation achievements within USAF. Now the award recognizes and outstanding technician or manager in environmental matters.

The AFA's Gen. E. W. Rawlings Chapter was chartered in Saint Paul in August 1982.

Eugene M. Zuckert, Secretary of the Air Force from 1961 to 1965, credits Rawlings with building a "mature, business-like" image for the newly established Air Force. Zuckert said Air Force Secretary Stuart Symington asked him in 1945 why he had to "send out a search party" whenever he needed Army Air Forces statistics, Zuckert remembered a Rawlings memo suggesting the creation of a comptroller position and passed the idea on to Symington. According to Zuckert, the methods developed by Rawlings constituted "a very important step in the development of a postwar Air Force."
