= Delhi Coronet Band Hall =

- Formerly listed on the U.S. National Register of Historic Places
- Location within Minnesota Location within the United States
- Location: Third Street, Delhi, Minnesota
- Coordinates: 44°35′52.5″N 95°12′44″W
- Built: 1896
- NRHP reference No.: 84001687
- Removed from NRHP: November 1, 2018

The Delhi Coronet Band Hall served as the venue for many social and political events in Delhi, Minnesota. A community band raised money to build the 1,600 square feet (150 m^{2}) hall on a stone foundation and played the first concert there on June 11, 1896. On November 25, 1902, residents met in the band hall to incorporate as a city and the first elections were held there. The single level wood-frame building with a false front and belfry eventually became the town hall and was listed on the National Register of Historic Places on May 17, 1984.

In 1997, the Preservation Alliance of Minnesota warned that it was in a "seriously deteriorated condition" and was virtually the only building left in the business district which had been two blocks long. It was removed from the National Register in 2018.
