= Aetna Township, Pipestone County, Minnesota =

Aetna Township, Minnesota
- Township
- Location within the state of Minnesota Aetna Township, Minnesota (the United States)
- Coordinates: 44°9′56″N 96°7′9″W
- Country: United States
- State: Minnesota
- County: Pipestone

Area
  - Total: 35.3 sq mi (91.3 km^{2})
  - Land: 35.2 sq mi (91.2 km^{2})
  - Water: 0 sq mi (0.0 km^{2})
- Elevation: 1,765 ft (538 m)

Population (2000)
  - Total: 201
  - Density: 5.7/sq mi (2.2/km^{2})
- Time zone: UTC-6 (Central (CST))
  - Summer (DST): UTC-5 (CDT)
- FIPS code: 27-00298
- GNIS feature ID: 0663383

Aetna Township is a township in Pipestone County, Minnesota, United States. The population was 201 at the 2000 census.

Aetna Township was organized in 1880, and named for Aetna Johnson, the daughter of a Norwegian settler.

== Geography ==
According to the United States Census Bureau, the township has a total area of 35.2 square miles (91 km^{2}), of which 35.2 square miles (91 km^{2}) is land and 0.03% is water.

== Demographics ==
As of the census of 2000, there were 201 people, 74 households, and 60 families residing in the township. The population density was 5.7 people per square mile (2.2/km^{2}). There were 81 housing units at an average density of 2.3/sq mi (0.9/km^{2}). The racial makeup of the township was 98.51% White, and 1.49% from two or more races.

There were 74 households, out of which 35.1% had children under the age of 18 living with them, 77.0% were married couples living together, 2.7% had a female householder with no husband present, and 17.6% were non-families. 16.2% of all households were made up of individuals, and 5.4% had someone living alone who was 65 years of age or older. The average household size was 2.72 and the average family size was 3.05.

In the township the population was spread out, with 26.9% under the age of 18, 8.5% from 18 to 24, 27.9% from 25 to 44, 21.9% from 45 to 64, and 14.9% who were 65 years of age or older. The median age was 36 years. For every 100 females, there were 118.5 males. For every 100 females age 18 and over, there were 110.0 males.

The median income for a household in the township was $32,292, and the median income for a family was $38,125. Males had a median income of $16,875 versus $19,821 for females. The per capita income for the township was $13,623. About 12.7% of families and 14.3% of the population were below the poverty line, including 15.1% of those under the age of eighteen and 14.3% of those sixty five or over.
