= Delhi, Minnesota =

City in Minnesota, United States

- City
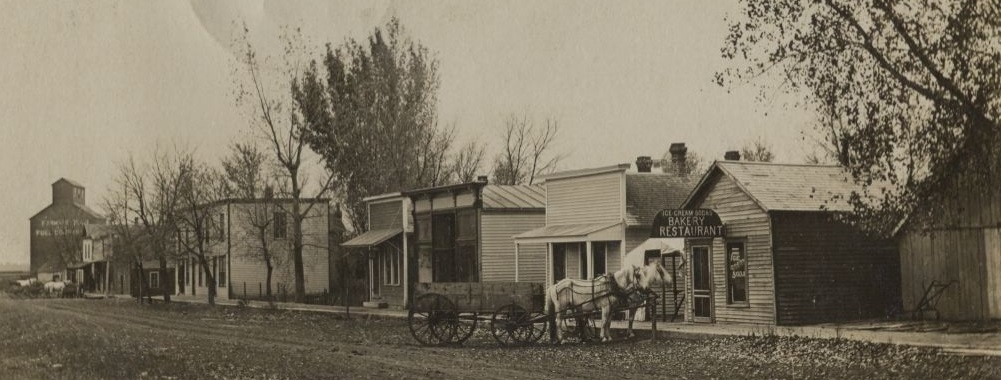
- Delhi, Minnesota in 1910

- Cities and townships of Redwood County
- Coordinates: 44°35′53″N 95°12′48″W
- Country: United States
- State: Minnesota
- County: Redwood
- Settled: 1865
- Organized: February 19, 1876
- Platted: 1884
- Incorporated: November 13, 1902

Government
  - Mayor: Cindy Bell

Area
  - Total: 0.761 sq mi (1.970 km^{2})
  - Land: 0.761 sq mi (1.970 km^{2})
  - Water: 0 sq mi (0.000 km^{2})
- Elevation: 1,030 ft (314 m)

Population (2020)
  - Total: 46
  - Estimate (2022): 46
  - Density: 60.5/sq mi (23.35/km^{2})
- Time zone: UTC−6 (Central (CST))
  - Summer (DST): UTC−5 (CDT)
- ZIP Code: 56283
- Area code: 507
- FIPS code: 27-15544
- GNIS feature ID: 0642755
- Sales tax: 7.375%

Delhi is a city in Redwood County, Minnesota, United States. The population was 46 at the 2020 census.

== History ==
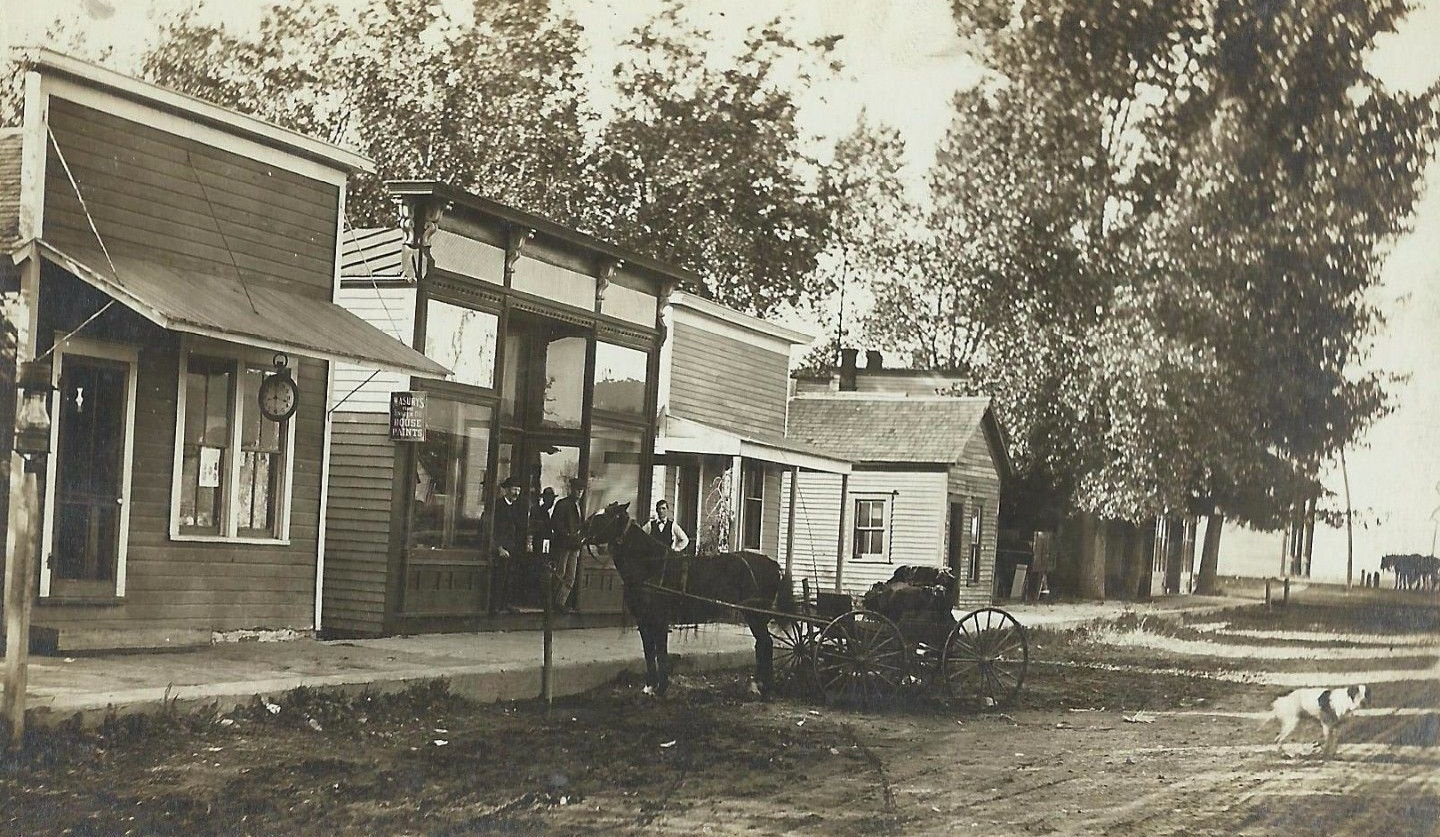
Downtown Delhi in 1909

Delhi was platted in 1884, and derives its name from Delhi, Ohio, located in the Cincinnati metropolitan area. A post office called Delhi was established in 1894, and remained in operation until 1979.

The Delhi Coronet Band Hall, built in 1896 for a community band, served as the venue for many social and political events in Delhi and was listed on the National Register of Historic Places. On November 25, 1902, residents met in the band hall to incorporate as a city and the first elections were held there.

== Geography ==
According to the United States Census Bureau, the city has a total area of 0.761 square miles (1.97 km^{2}), all land. Principal streets in Delhi include County Road 9, which connects to Belview five miles to the west, and County Road 6, which connects to Minnesota State Highways 19 and 67 three miles to the south. The main east west street is Vanderburg Avenue.

== Demographics ==
Historical population
Census	Pop.	Note	%±
1910	159		—
1920	194		22.0%
1930	178		−8.2%
1940	174		−2.2%
1950	152		−12.6%
1960	124		−18.4%
1970	154		24.2%
1980	96		−37.7%
1990	69		−28.1%
2000	69		0.0%
2010	70		1.4%
2020	46		−34.3%
2022 (est.)	46		0.0%
U.S. Decennial Census; 2020 Census

=== 2010 census ===
As of the 2010 census, there were 70 people, 31 households, and 19 families living in the city. The population density was 89.7 inhabitants per square mile (34.6/km^{2}). There were 35 housing units at an average density of 44.9 per square mile (17.3/km^{2}). The racial makeup of the city was 98.6% White and 1.4% Pacific Islander.

There were 31 households, of which 19.4% had children under the age of 18 living with them, 54.8% were married couples living together, 6.5% had a female householder with no husband present, and 38.7% were non-families. 29.0% of all households were made up of individuals, and 3.2% had someone living alone who was 65 years of age or older. The average household size was 2.26 and the average family size was 2.84.

The median age in the city was 48 years. 21.4% of residents were under the age of 18; 2.9% were between the ages of 18 and 24; 20.1% were from 25 to 44; 48.5% were from 45 to 64; and 7.1% were 65 years of age or older. The gender makeup of the city was 48.6% male and 51.4% female.

=== 2000 census ===
As of the 2000 census, there were 69 people, 28 households, and 16 families living in the city. The population density was 89.9 inhabitants per square mile (34.7/km^{2}). There were 35 housing units at an average density of 45.6 per square mile (17.6/km^{2}). The racial makeup of the city was 95.65% White, 1.45% from other races, and 2.90% from two or more races. Hispanic or Latino of any race were 4.35% of the population.

There were 28 households, out of which 32.1% had children under the age of 18 living with them, 53.6% were married couples living together, 3.6% had a female householder with no husband present, and 39.3% were non-families. 32.1% of all households were made up of individuals, and 14.3% had someone living alone who was 65 years of age or older. The average household size was 2.46 and the average family size was 3.24.

In the city, the population was spread out, with 31.9% under the age of 18, 4.3% from 18 to 24, 31.9% from 25 to 44, 18.8% from 45 to 64, and 13.0% who were 65 years of age or older. The median age was 34 years. For every 100 females, there were 81.6 males. For every 100 females age 18 and over, there were 95.8 males.

The median income for a household in the city was $31,875, and the median income for a family was $31,750. Males had a median income of $24,375 versus $21,250 for females. The per capita income for the city was $9,829. There were no families and 2.2% of the population living below the poverty line, including no under eighteens and 50.0% of those over 64.
