= Firemen's Hall (Cannon Falls, Minnesota) =

- U.S. National Register of Historic Places
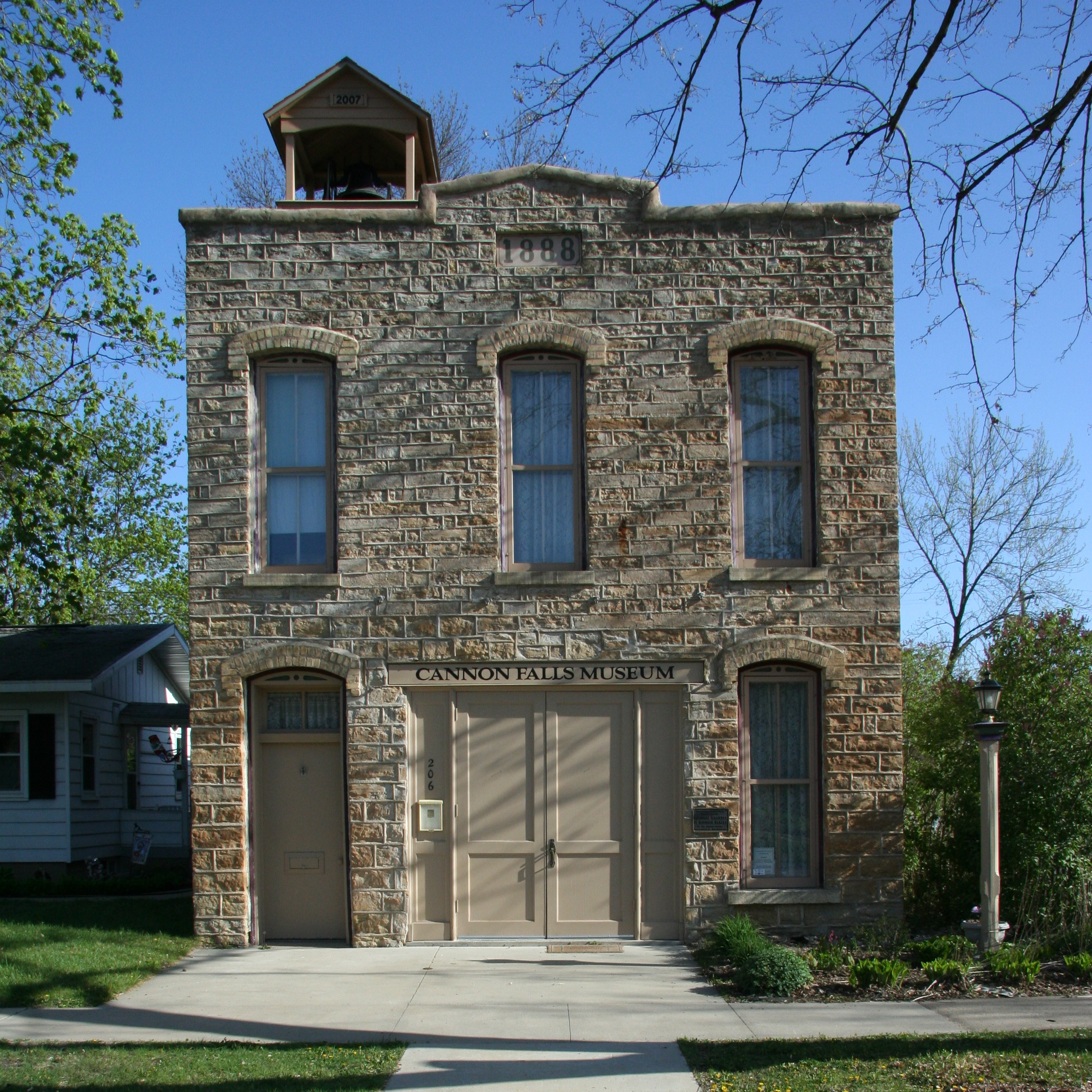

- Location within Minnesota
- Location: 206 W. Mill St., Cannon Falls, Minnesota
- Coordinates: 44°30′29″N 92°54′12″W
- Area: less than one acre
- Built: 1888
- Architectural style: Italianate
- MPS: Rural Goodhue County MRA
- NRHP reference No.: 80002041
- Added to NRHP: February 12, 1980

The Firemen's Hall in Cannon Falls, Minnesota, at 206 W. Mill St., was built in 1888. It was listed on the National Register of Historic Places in 1980.

It was built after fires in 1884 and 1887 devastated the town's business district. It is an 1888 fire station reflecting the peril from and response to fires in the period's communities.

In 2012, it was the Cannon Falls Area Historical Society's museum.

It is a two-story 24 by 35 feet (7.3 m × 10.7 m) limestone building with some elements of Italianate style.

It was the Cannon Falls Library from 1953 to 1976.
