= Camden State Park =

- Camden State Park CCC/WPA/Rustic Style Historic District
- U.S. National Register of Historic Places
- U.S. Historic district
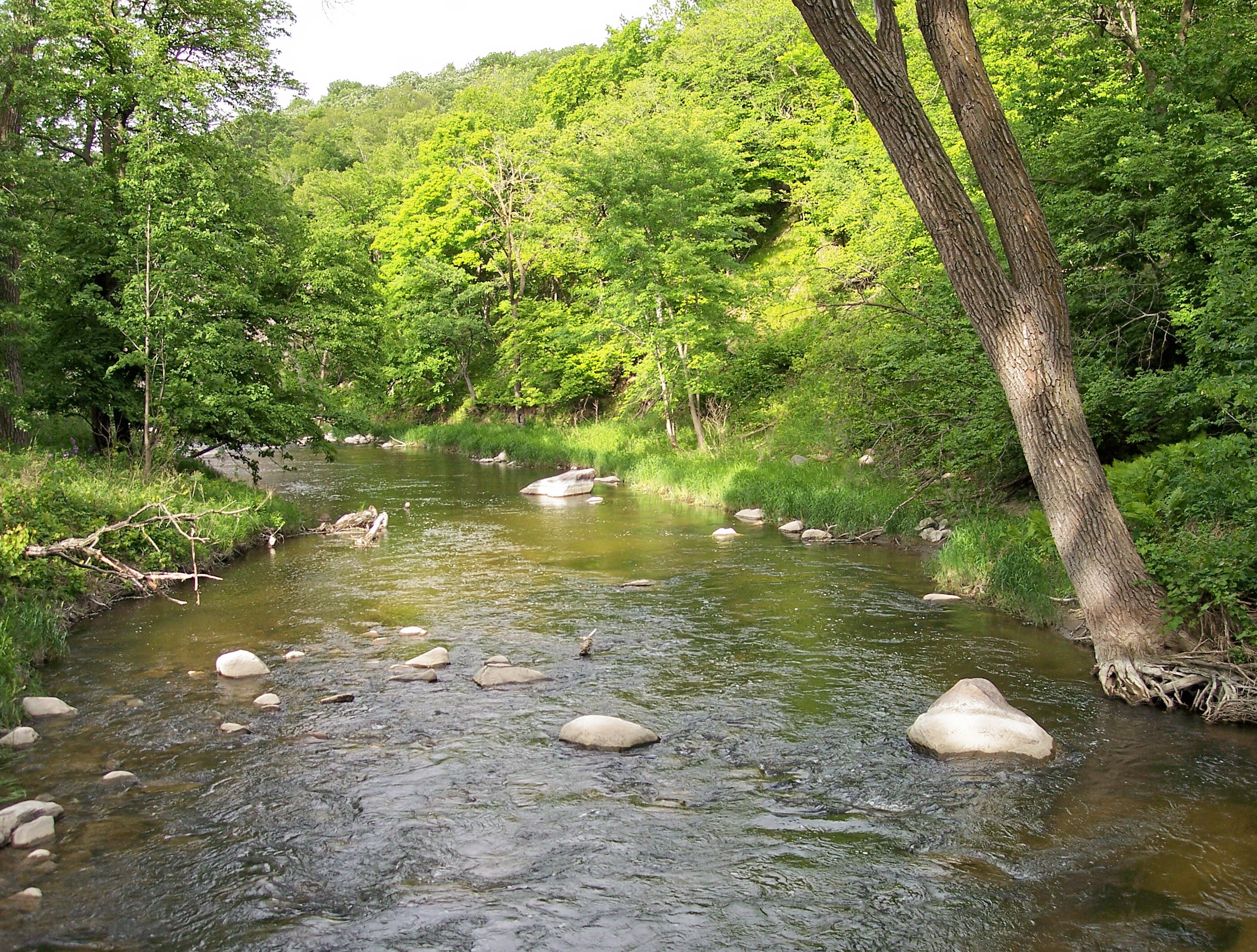
- The Redwood River as viewed downstream from a road bridge in the park

- Location within Minnesota Location within the United States
- Location: Lyon County, Minnesota, Off MN 23 SW of Lynd
- Nearest city: Lynd, Minnesota
- Coordinates: 44°22′4″N 95°55′29″W
- Area: 2,247 acres (909 ha)
- Built: 1934
- Architect: Multiple
- Architectural style: NPS rustic architecture
- MPS: Minnesota State Park CCC/WPA/Rustic Style MPS
- NRHP reference No.: 89001669
- Added to NRHP: April 19, 1991

Camden State Park is a state park on the Redwood River in southwestern Minnesota near Marshall. It is used for picnics, camping, hiking, and other outdoor recreation.

The park, originally known as Camden Woods, was acquired in 1934, and development started in 1935 with workers from the Veterans Conservation Corps, an offshoot of the Civilian Conservation Corps. The landscape design in the park was planned by the National Park Service, and the master-planned development allowed the Redwood River to determine the placement of various functional areas in the park. After the VCC finished their development in 1936, the Works Progress Administration dismantled the VCC camp buildings and built the Swimming Instructor's Cabin and the Ice and Wood House. Thirteen buildings and structures, built by the VCC and the WPA, are listed on the National Register of Historic Places.

A 1971 study by the Minnesota Academy of Science and The Nature Conservancy found that Camden State Park contained one of the westernmost natural occurrences of the sugar maple in North America.

In the 1980s, the park began a prairie restoration project. The original sites were two acres or less in size, and contained about 35 grasses and wildflowers. The prairie plants have been maintained and expanded, in part through the use of controlled burns.

== Species ==
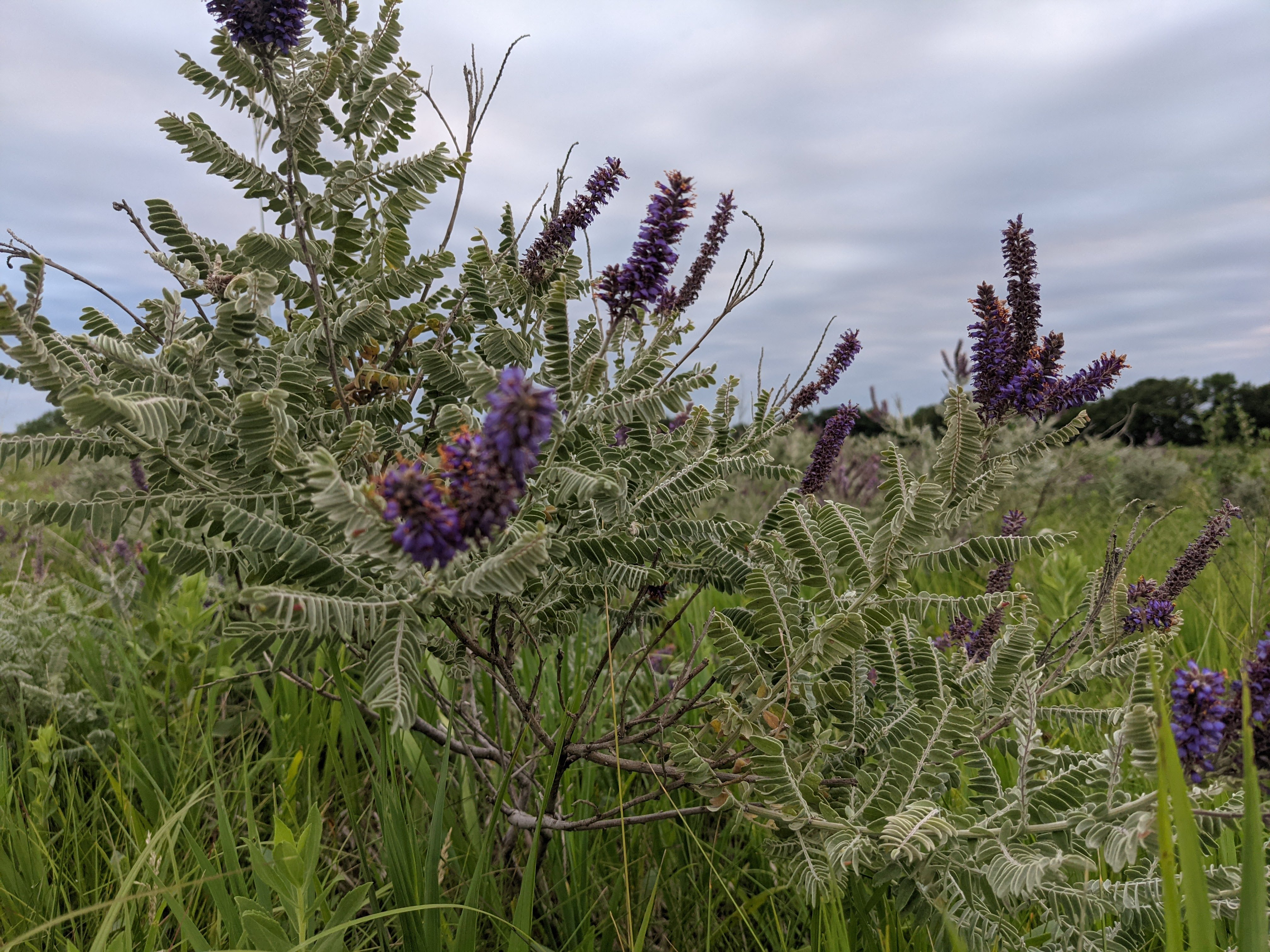
Amorpha canescens Lead Plant. Restoration Trail - Camden State Park, MN. 20210708.

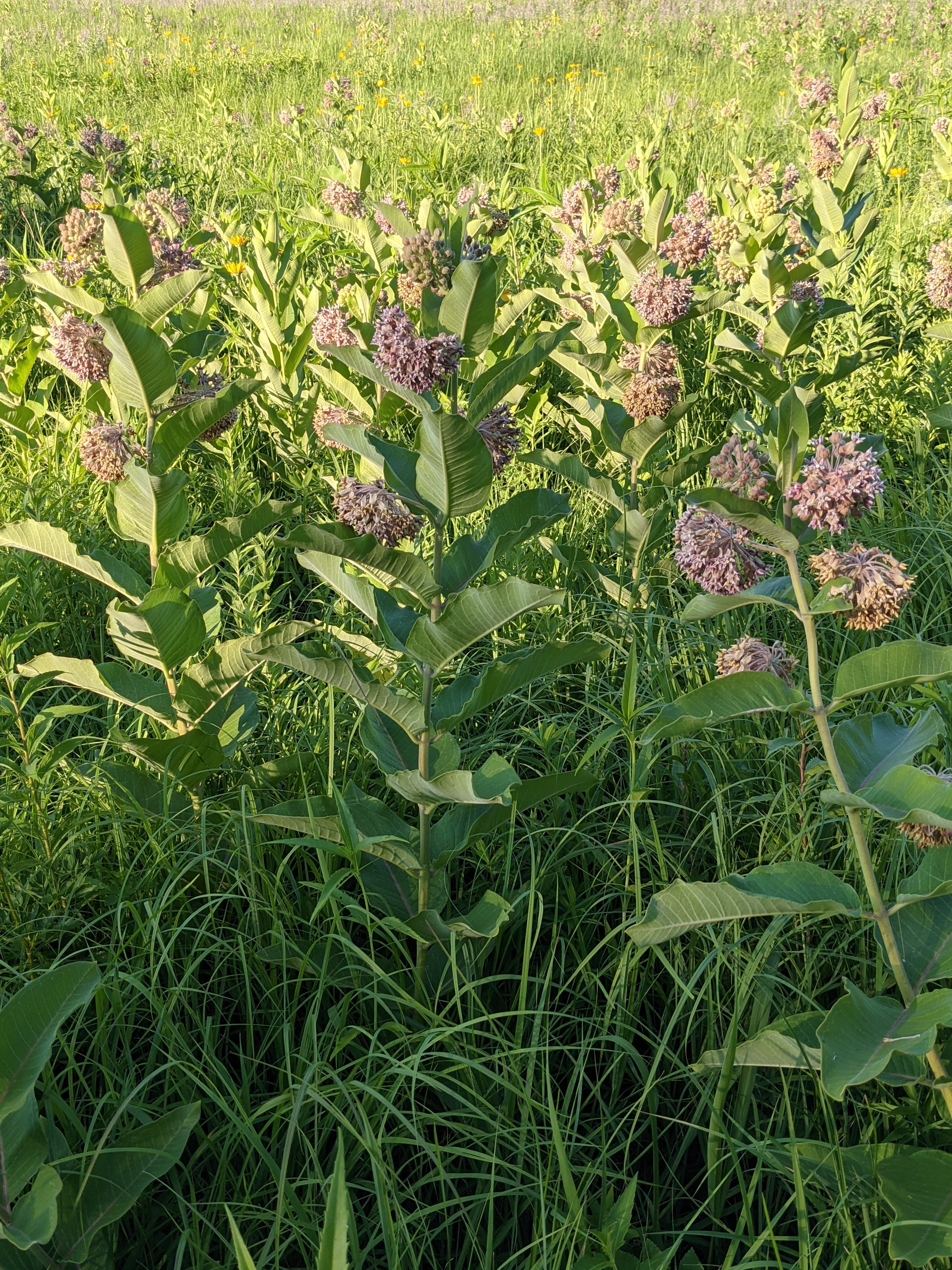
Asclepias syriaca Common milkweed. Restoration Trail - Camden State Park, MN. 20210630.

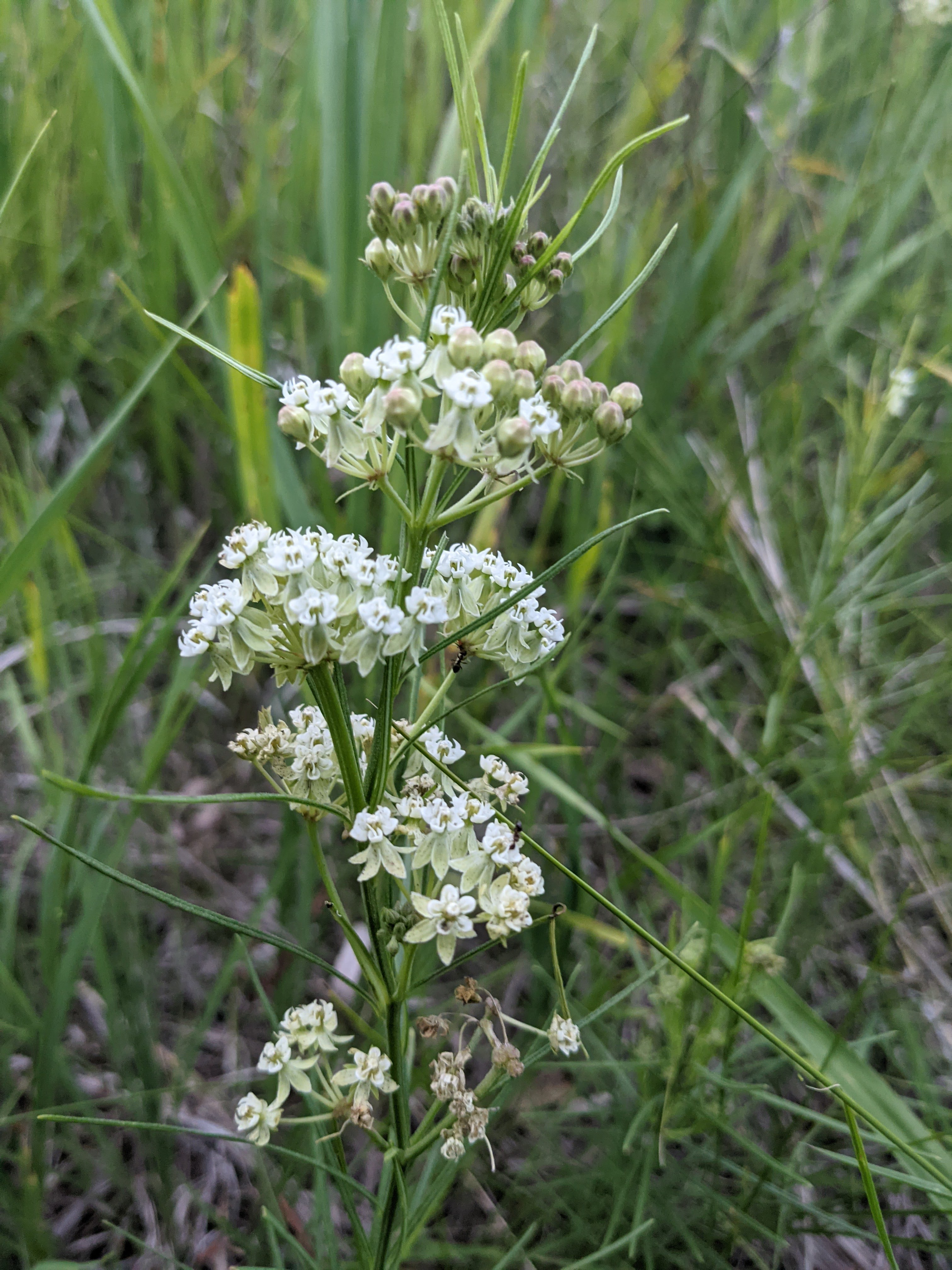
Asclepias verticillata Whorled milkweed. Restoration Trail - Camden State Park, MN. 20210708

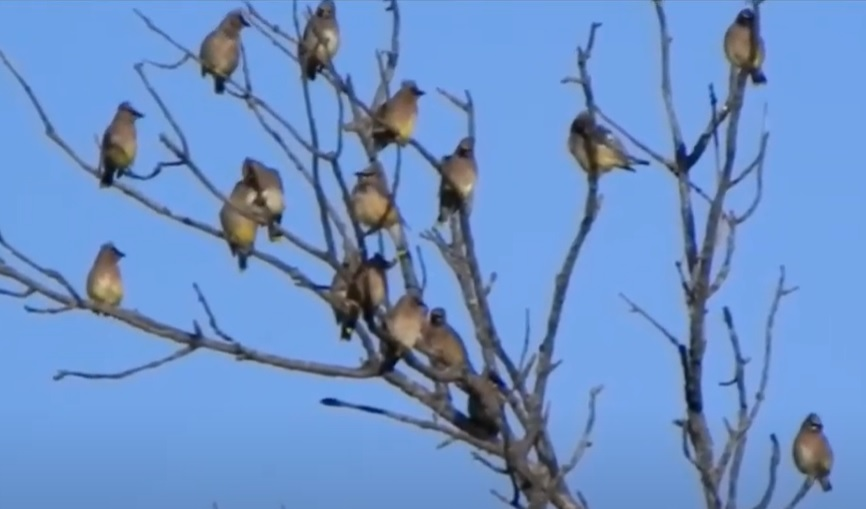
Bombycilla cedrorum Cedar Waxwing. Camden State Park, MN. 20160531.

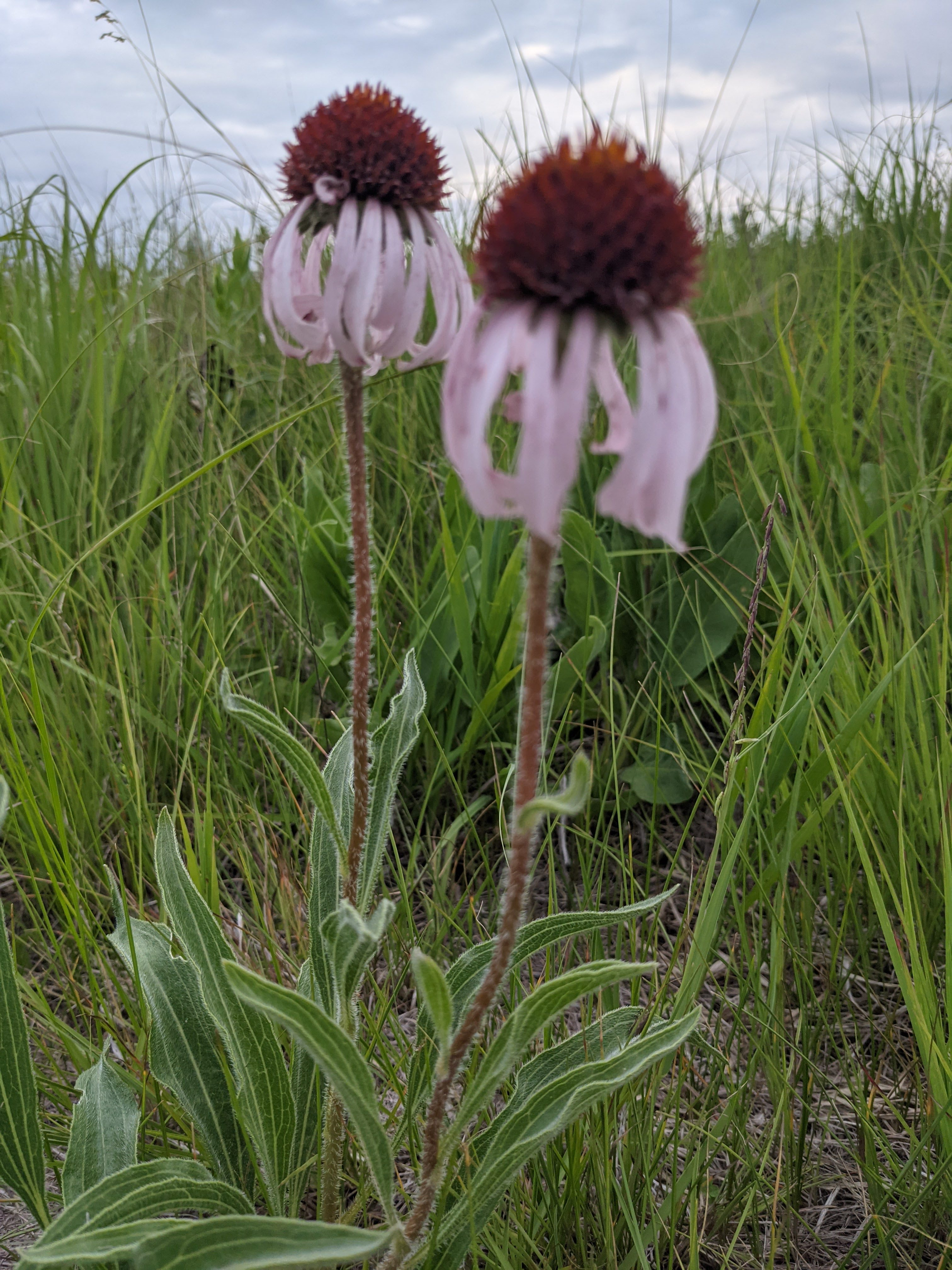
Echinacea angustifolia Narrow-leaved purple coneflower. Restoration Trail - Camden State Park, MN. 20210708.

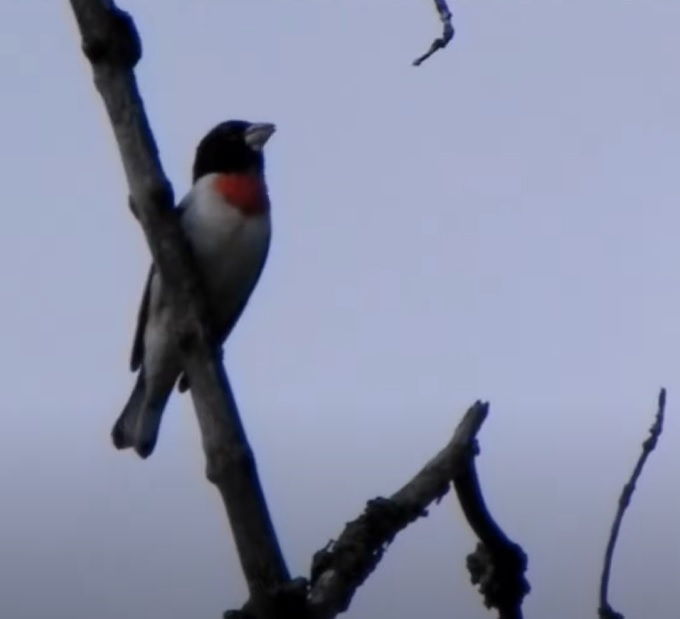
Pheucticus ludovicianus Rose-Breasted Grosbeak. Camden State Park, MN. 20160520.

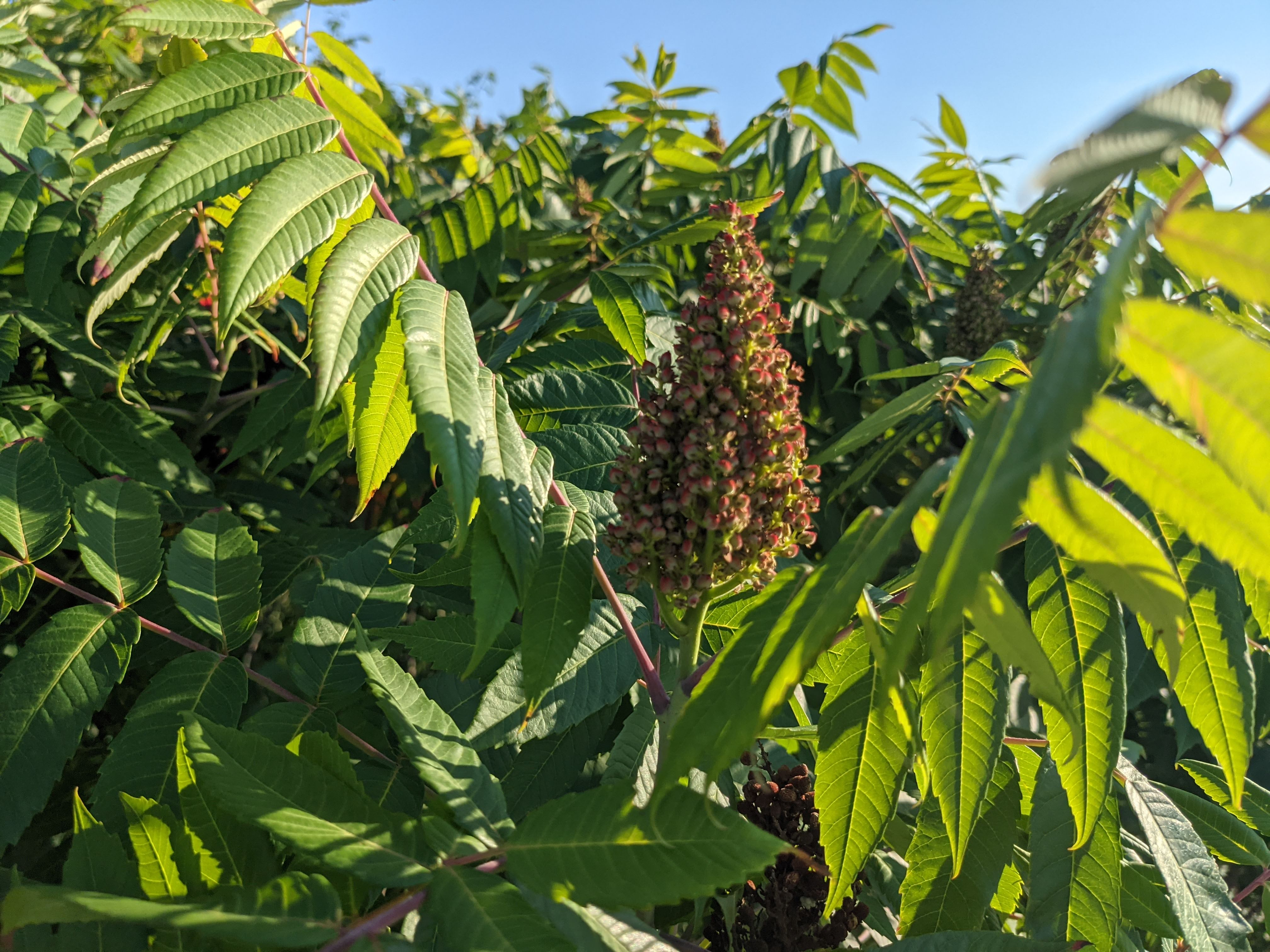
Rhus glabra Smooth sumac. Restoration Trail - Camden State Park, MN. 20210630.
