= Revere Fire Hall =

- U.S. National Register of Historic Places
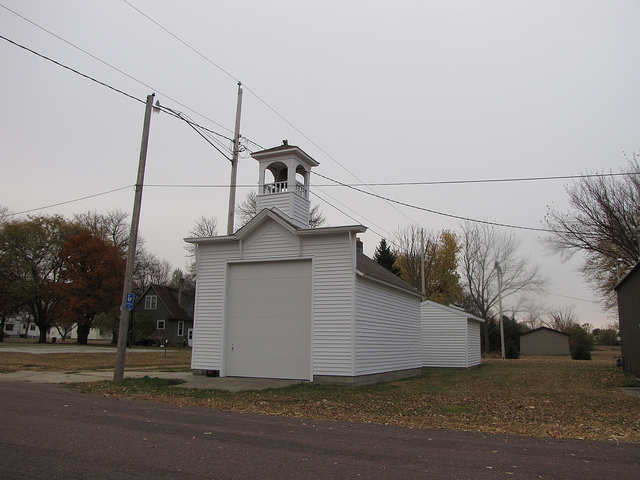

- Location within Minnesota
- Location: 2nd St., Revere, Minnesota
- Coordinates: 44°13′21″N 95°21′55″W
- Area: less than one acre
- Built: c.1900
- MPS: Redwood County MRA
- NRHP reference No.: 80002145
- Added to NRHP: August 11, 1980

The Revere Fire Hall, on 2nd St. in Revere, Minnesota, was built around 1900. It was listed on the National Register of Historic Places in 1980.

It is a small building with a false front. It has a square bell tower with a flagpole. It is located on a side street but near the center of Revere, about half a block from the new fire station built in 1974.

It is representative of common, specialized municipal buildings.
