= Clements, Minnesota =

City in Minnesota, United States

Clements
- City
- Cities and townships of Redwood County
- Coordinates: 44°22′52″N 95°3′13″W
- Country: United States
- State: Minnesota
- County: Redwood

Area
  - Total: 0.38 sq mi (0.98 km^{2})
  - Land: 0.38 sq mi (0.98 km^{2})
  - Water: 0 sq mi (0.00 km^{2})
- Elevation: 1,050 ft (320 m)

Population (2020)
  - Total: 155
  - Density: 410.8/sq mi (158.63/km^{2})
- Time zone: UTC-6 (Central (CST))
  - Summer (DST): UTC-5 (CDT)
- ZIP code: 56224
- Area code: 507
- FIPS code: 27-11836
- GNIS feature ID: 0641326

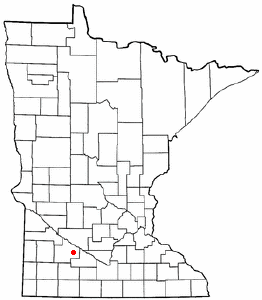
Location of Clements, Minnesota

Clements is a city in Redwood County, Minnesota, United States. As of the 2020 census, Clements had a population of 155.

== History ==
A post office has been in operation at Clements since 1900. Clements was platted in 1902. The city was named for Peter O. Clements, an early settler.

== Geography ==
According to the United States Census Bureau, the city has a total area of 0.38 square miles (0.98 km^{2}), all land.

Principal streets in Clements include County Road 16, which connects to U.S. Highway 71 three miles to the west, and County Road 1, which connects to Minnesota Highway 68 nearly two miles to the north.

== Demographics ==
Historical population
Census	Pop.	Note	%±
1910	132		—
1920	196		48.5%
1930	206		5.1%
1940	240		16.5%
1950	239		−0.4%
1960	269		12.6%
1970	252		−6.3%
1980	227		−9.9%
1990	191		−15.9%
2000	191		0.0%
2010	153		−19.9%
2020	155		1.3%
U.S. Decennial Census

=== 2010 census ===
As of the census of 2010, there were 153 people, 66 households, and 42 families living in the city. The population density was 402.6 inhabitants per square mile (155.4/km^{2}). There were 80 housing units at an average density of 210.5 per square mile (81.3/km^{2}). The racial makeup of the city was 92.2% White, 5.2% Asian, and 2.6% from two or more races. Hispanic or Latino of any race were 4.6% of the population.

There were 66 households, of which 28.8% had children under the age of 18 living with them, 57.6% were married couples living together, 4.5% had a female householder with no husband present, 1.5% had a male householder with no wife present, and 36.4% were non-families. 30.3% of all households were made up of individuals, and 13.7% had someone living alone who was 65 years of age or older. The average household size was 2.32 and the average family size was 2.88.

The median age in the city was 42.4 years. 24.8% of residents were under the age of 18; 3.3% were between the ages of 18 and 24; 25.5% were from 25 to 44; 31.3% were from 45 to 64; and 15% were 65 years of age or older. The gender makeup of the city was 53.6% male and 46.4% female.

=== 2000 census ===
At the 2000 census, there were 191 people, 76 households and 45 families living in the city. The population density was 496.3 inhabitants per square mile (191.6/km^{2}). There were 81 housing units at an average density of 210.5 per square mile (81.3/km^{2}). The racial makeup of the city was 98.43% White, 0.52% Native American, 0.52% Pacific Islander, and 0.52% from two or more races.

There were 76 households, of which 35.5% had children under the age of 18 living with them, 51.3% were married couples living together, 3.9% had a female householder with no husband present, and 39.5% were non-families. 32.9% of all households were made up of individuals, and 13.2% had someone living alone who was 65 years of age or older. The average household size was 2.51 and the average family size was 3.24.

Age distribution was 32.5% under the age of 18, 5.8% from 18 to 24, 29.8% from 25 to 44, 20.9% from 45 to 64, and 11.0% who were 65 years of age or older. The median age was 34 years. For every 100 females, there were 114.6 males. For every 100 females age 18 and over, there were 118.6 males.

The median household income was $35,000, and the median family income was $46,250. Males had a median income of $33,000 versus $16,406 for females. The per capita income for the city was $15,204. None of the families and 3.5% of the population were living below the poverty line.
