= Redwood Falls, Minnesota =

City in Minnesota, United States

Redwood Falls
- City
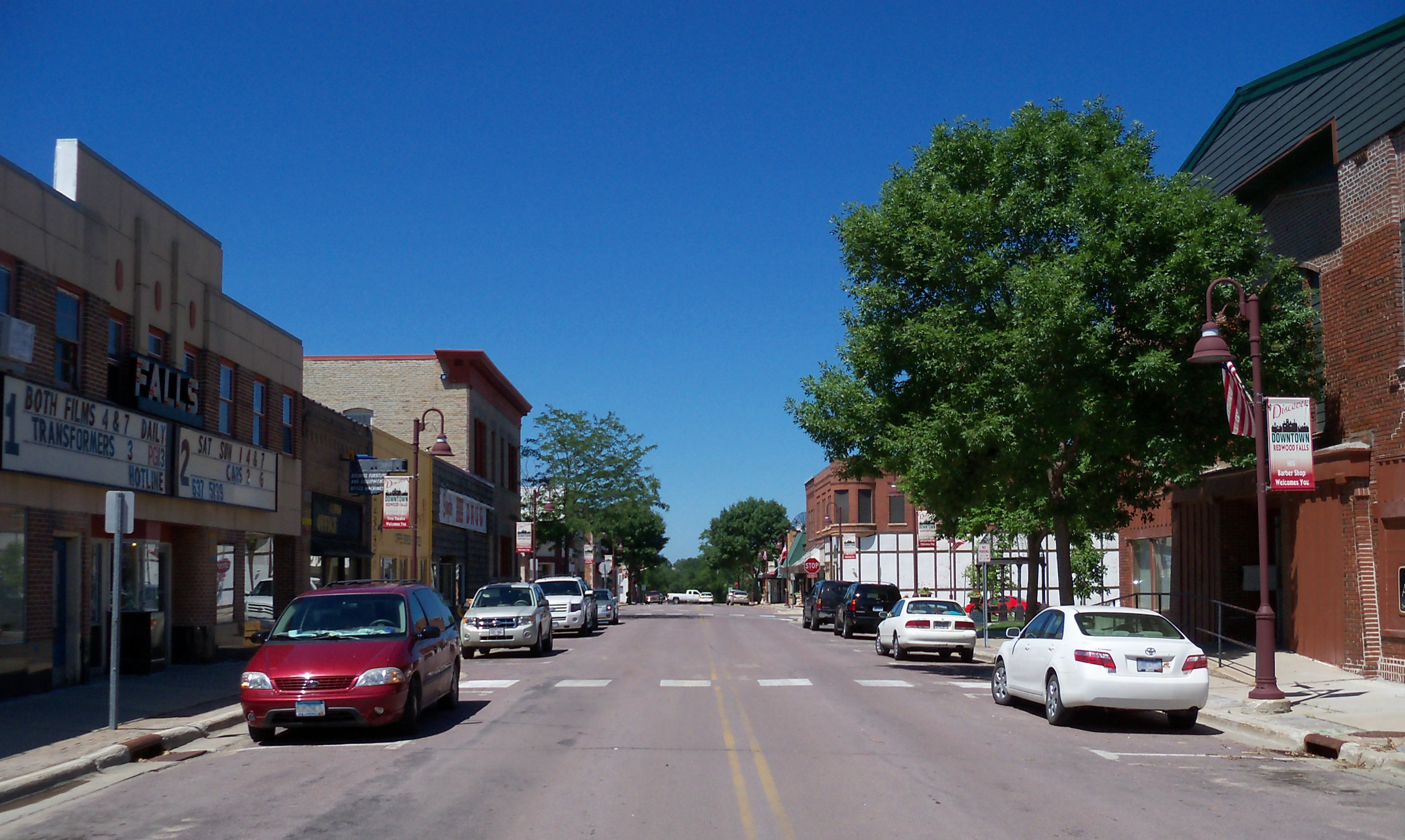
- Street in downtown Redwood Falls
- Motto: The town of redwood trees
- Location of Redwood Falls within Redwood County and state of Minnesota
- Coordinates: 44°32′49″N 95°06′11″W
- Country: United States
- State: Minnesota
- Counties: Redwood
- Settlement: 1864
- Platted: October 1865
- Incorporated (village): March 9, 1876
- Incorporated (city): April 1, 1891

Area
  - Total: 5.41 sq mi (14.00 km^{2})
  - Land: 5.28 sq mi (13.68 km^{2})
  - Water: 0.12 sq mi (0.32 km^{2})
- Elevation: 1,024 ft (312 m)

Population (2020)
  - Total: 5,102
  - Estimate (2022): 5,084
  - Density: 966.0/sq mi (372.99/km^{2})
- Time zone: UTC-6 (Central)
  - Summer (DST): UTC-5 (CDT)
- ZIP code: 56283
- Area code: 507
- FIPS code: 27-53656
- GNIS feature ID: 2396342
- Website: ci.redwood-falls.mn.us

Redwood Falls is a city in Redwood County, located along the Redwood River near its confluence with the Minnesota River, in the U.S. state of Minnesota. The population was 5,102 at the 2020 census. It is the county seat.

== History ==
As the immigrant and the Euro-American population of the North American east coast region grew, population pressures affected people far inland. People moved west to find new homes as more and more land was used by farmers. The Minnesota area is the ancestral homeland of the several Dakota peoples, who consisted of the loosely confederated Oceti sakowin (Seven Council Fires). By 1700, Ojibwe, who spoke an Anishinaabe language, had also come to what is now Minnesota from the further east around the Great Lakes. At times they came into conflict with the Dakota over land and resources and began to push them to the west.

=== 19th century ===
By the mid-19th century, the traditional Dakota yearly cycle of farming, hunting, fishing, and gathering wild rice had been disrupted by cultural changes. Permanent farms were established by European-American settlers, changing habitat. In addition, they removed forests in eastern Minnesota for timber and to develop farmland. Wild game such as bison, elk, whitetail deer, and bear had been hunted so intensively that populations were much reduced compared to the centuries before Euro-American settlement. Dakota people relied on the sale of valuable furs to American traders to earn cash needed to buy necessities.

To encourage the Dakota to bring in more furs, traders offered merchandise on credit. It is not clear that the Dakota well understood the concept of credit, but they grew to depend on trade goods for metal tools and other items.

Pressure from traders who wanted to be paid and concern from government officials about the ability of the Dakota to earn the money they needed, led to the 1851 Treaty of Traverse des Sioux. The federal government wanted to extinguish Native American land title to tracts of land and offered the people annuities of money and goods in exchange. The Dakota agreed to live on a twenty-mile-wide reservation centered on a 75-mile stretch of the upper Minnesota River. Annuity payments for the Dakota were late in the summer of 1862, an example of a pattern of poor delivery of payments and supplies to them.

The site of the future town of Redwood Falls was within the Dakota reservation area along the lower Minnesota River. The war of 1862 was a small segment in Sioux history of conflict with European Americans. Corruption and malfeasance by the Bureau of Indian Affairs resulted in delays of payments of annuities and supplies of promised supplies, causing great hardships for the Dakota. In addition, they struggled with the effects of the relocation and inability to adjust to settled subsistence farming.

An August 4, 1862 confrontation between soldiers and Dakota men led the Indian Agency near Granite Falls to distribute provisions to the tribe on credit to avoid violence. At the Lower Agency at Redwood, however, things were handled differently. At an August 15, 1862 meeting attended by Dakota representatives, Indian Agent Thomas Galbraith, and representatives of the traders, the traders resisted pleas to distributing provisions held in agency warehouses to starving Dakota until the annuity payments arrived. In 1862, U.S. officials in Minnesota were distracted by the U.S. Civil War, payments did not arrive, and the suffering of the Dakota was severe. Some young Dakota took action to claim what they were owed, killing several people in the process. This began the Dakota War of 1862.

As a result of the war, the U.S. government hanged 38 participants and attempted to expel the Dakota people from Minnesota altogether. However, it ended up maintaining the Lower Sioux Indian Reservation in Redwood County. Over time, the Dakota lost control of much of the land first set aside in 1851.

In 1864, Samuel McPhail, a colonel who had commanded US troops in the war and was a land speculator, claimed the land where Redwood Falls was developed. He hired men to use lumber from the Dakota reservation to build a fortified house and surrounded it with a sod stockade eight feet tall. McPhail published the Redwood Falls Patriot from 1866 to 1869. He was a probate judge and first Redwood County attorney. In 1872, he donated land for the county courthouse as Redwood Falls was designated as the county seat.

Among settlers who joined McPhail in 1864 was John St. George Honner. Honner claimed land north of Redwood Falls. The house he built in 1869 still stands in North Redwood and is listed on the National Register of Historic Places. Honner was appointed as the first postmaster and also served as a county official. Active in electoral politics, he served as a representative and later as a senator in the state legislature between 1866 and 1874. Honner operated a granite quarry near North Redwood and supplied the stone for the county courthouse.

=== 20th century to present ===
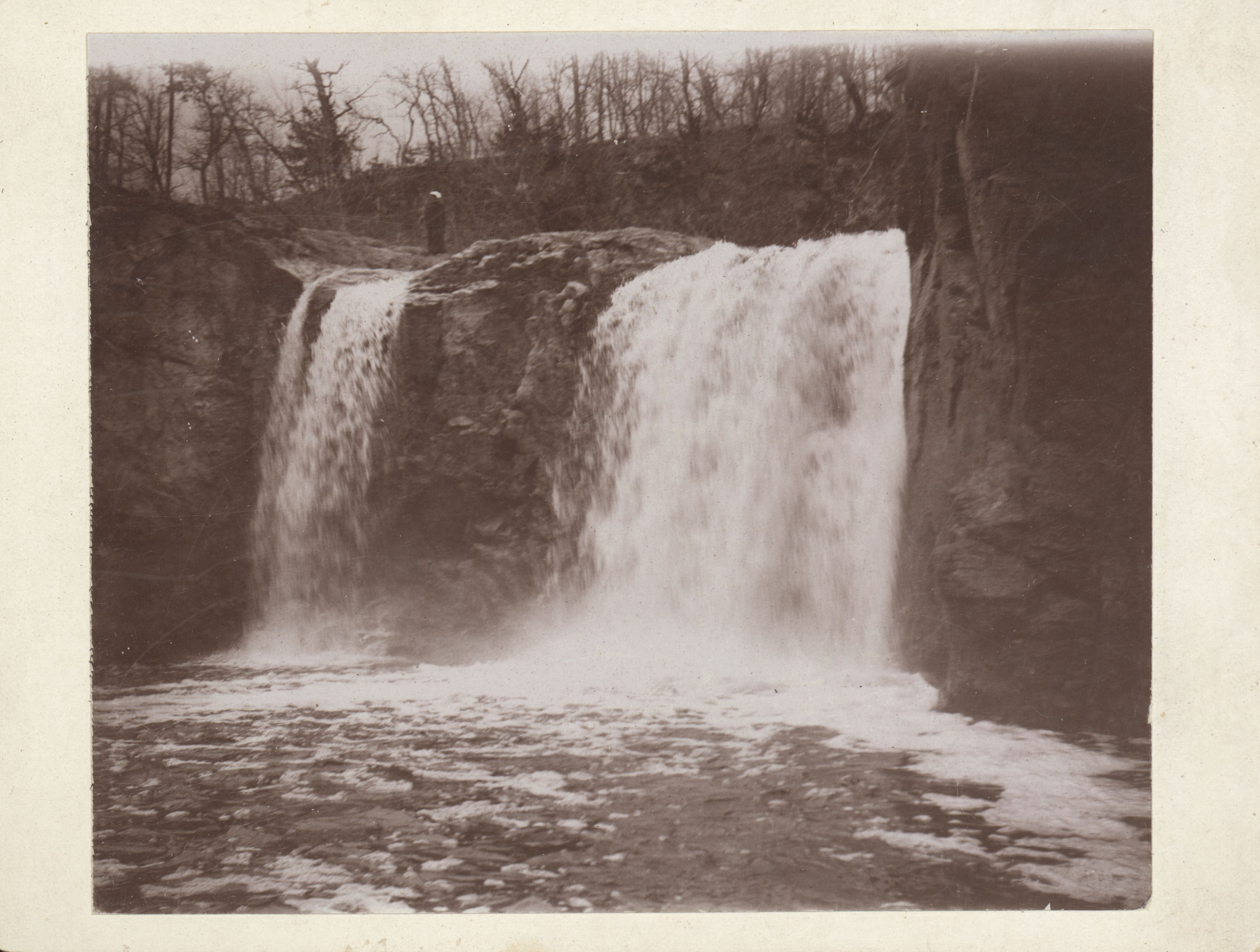
Ramsey Falls

After World War II, Redwood Falls was home to the Minnesota Inventors Congress. Started in 1958 to encourage innovation and entrepreneurship and attract industry to town, MIC held a juried exhibition each year. It also sponsored a contest for student inventors and a parade for the city. After a 58-year run, the MIC was ended in 2014 due to a lack of funding.

The city of Redwood Falls took over Alexander Ramsey Park in 1958 from the state of Minnesota. Ramsey had been one of the least used and least developed state parks. It has been improved as the largest municipal park in Minnesota. In 2018 signage was added with the Dakota name of the park, Caŋŝayapi, which translates to “where they paint the trees red”.

The cities of North Redwood and Redwood Falls merged in 1996; they are now known as the single entity, Redwood Falls. In 2010 Native Americans composed more than 6% of the population in the city.

== Geography ==
According to the United States Census Bureau, the city has a total area of 5.38 square miles (13.93 km^{2}); 5.25 square miles (13.60 km^{2}) is land and 0.13 square miles (0.34 km^{2}) is water. The Redwood River flows through the city near its mouth at the Minnesota River.

Redwood Falls is located along U.S. Highway 71. Other main highways in the city include Minnesota State Highways 19 and 67.

=== Climate ===
Redwood Falls has a hot-summer humid continental climate (Köppen Dfa), with hot summers and freezing winters.

Climate data for Redwood Falls, Minnesota (1991–2020 normals, extremes 1909–present)
Month	Jan	Feb	Mar	Apr	May	Jun	Jul	Aug	Sep	Oct	Nov	Dec	Year
Record high °F (°C)	59 (15)	66 (19)	86 (30)	94 (34)	99 (37)	102 (39)	104 (40)	95 (35)	97 (36)	92 (33)	82 (28)	56 (13)	104 (40)
Mean daily maximum °F (°C)	22.6 (−5.2)	28.2 (−2.1)	40.1 (4.5)	56.0 (13.3)	69.1 (20.6)	78.7 (25.9)	83.2 (28.4)	81.1 (27.3)	74.1 (23.4)	59.5 (15.3)	42.1 (5.6)	27.8 (−2.3)	55.2 (12.9)
Daily mean °F (°C)	13.5 (−10.3)	18.3 (−7.6)	30.5 (−0.8)	44.8 (7.1)	57.7 (14.3)	68.0 (20.0)	71.9 (22.2)	70.0 (21.1)	62.0 (16.7)	47.9 (8.8)	32.8 (0.4)	19.7 (−6.8)	44.8 (7.1)
Mean daily minimum °F (°C)	4.3 (−15.4)	8.4 (−13.1)	20.9 (−6.2)	33.6 (0.9)	46.3 (7.9)	57.4 (14.1)	60.5 (15.8)	58.9 (14.9)	50.0 (10.0)	36.4 (2.4)	23.6 (−4.7)	11.6 (−11.3)	34.3 (1.3)
Record low °F (°C)	−36 (−38)	−26 (−32)	−18 (−28)	−3 (−19)	26 (−3)	23 (−5)	46 (8)	40 (4)	30 (−1)	9 (−13)	−13 (−25)	−26 (−32)	−36 (−38)
Average precipitation inches (mm)	0.67 (17)	0.92 (23)	1.63 (41)	2.86 (73)	4.10 (104)	4.99 (127)	3.71 (94)	4.23 (107)	3.14 (80)	2.38 (60)	1.31 (33)	0.95 (24)	30.89 (785)
Average snowfall inches (cm)	7.1 (18)	9.3 (24)	8.9 (23)	3.9 (9.9)	0.1 (0.25)	0.0 (0.0)	0.0 (0.0)	0.0 (0.0)	0.0 (0.0)	0.5 (1.3)	4.4 (11)	9.4 (24)	43.6 (111)
Average precipitation days (≥ 0.01 in)	5.3	4.8	5.8	8.2	10.5	10.1	7.7	8.0	7.1	7.0	4.5	5.4	84.4
Average snowy days (≥ 0.1 in)	5.0	4.1	2.8	1.1	0.1	0.0	0.0	0.0	0.0	0.3	1.6	4.4	19.4
Source: NOAA

Climate data for Redwood Falls Municipal Airport, Minnesota (1991–2020 normals, extremes 1906–present)
Month	Jan	Feb	Mar	Apr	May	Jun	Jul	Aug	Sep	Oct	Nov	Dec	Year
Record high °F (°C)	68 (20)	67 (19)	86 (30)	96 (36)	107 (42)	108 (42)	110 (43)	105 (41)	105 (41)	93 (34)	82 (28)	70 (21)	110 (43)
Mean daily maximum °F (°C)	23.4 (−4.8)	27.8 (−2.3)	40.5 (4.7)	56.6 (13.7)	69.9 (21.1)	79.8 (26.6)	83.6 (28.7)	81.0 (27.2)	74.3 (23.5)	59.2 (15.1)	42.2 (5.7)	28.2 (−2.1)	55.5 (13.1)
Daily mean °F (°C)	14.6 (−9.7)	18.7 (−7.4)	31.5 (−0.3)	45.7 (7.6)	58.7 (14.8)	68.9 (20.5)	72.6 (22.6)	70.0 (21.1)	62.3 (16.8)	48.3 (9.1)	33.1 (0.6)	20.0 (−6.7)	45.4 (7.4)
Mean daily minimum °F (°C)	5.7 (−14.6)	9.6 (−12.4)	22.5 (−5.3)	34.9 (1.6)	47.5 (8.6)	58.1 (14.5)	61.6 (16.4)	59.0 (15.0)	50.2 (10.1)	37.3 (2.9)	23.9 (−4.5)	11.7 (−11.3)	35.2 (1.8)
Record low °F (°C)	−36 (−38)	−33 (−36)	−25 (−32)	3 (−16)	21 (−6)	28 (−2)	40 (4)	36 (2)	25 (−4)	3 (−16)	−15 (−26)	−31 (−35)	−36 (−38)
Average precipitation inches (mm)	0.58 (15)	0.67 (17)	1.50 (38)	2.64 (67)	3.65 (93)	4.66 (118)	3.37 (86)	4.00 (102)	2.85 (72)	2.21 (56)	1.19 (30)	0.69 (18)	28.01 (711)
Average precipitation days (≥ 0.01 in)	5.0	5.1	7.3	9.6	11.4	12.2	8.9	8.9	8.2	8.5	5.4	5.4	95.9
Source: NOAA

== Demographics ==
Historical population
Census	Pop.	Note	%±
1880	981		—
1890	1,238		26.2%
1900	1,661		34.2%
1910	1,666		0.3%
1920	2,421		45.3%
1930	2,552		5.4%
1940	3,270		28.1%
1950	3,813		16.6%
1960	4,285		12.4%
1970	4,774		11.4%
1980	5,210		9.1%
1990	4,859		−6.7%
2000	5,459		12.3%
2010	5,254		−3.8%
2020	5,102		−2.9%
2022 (est.)	5,084		−0.4%
U.S. Decennial Census; 2020 Census

=== 2020 census ===
As of the 2020 census, Redwood Falls had a population of 5,102. The median age was 40.4 years. 24.1% of residents were under the age of 18 and 22.0% of residents were 65 years of age or older. For every 100 females there were 99.2 males, and for every 100 females age 18 and over there were 93.9 males age 18 and over.

90.1% of residents lived in urban areas, while 9.9% lived in rural areas.

There were 2,226 households in Redwood Falls, of which 27.0% had children under the age of 18 living in them. Of all households, 41.9% were married-couple households, 20.4% were households with a male householder and no spouse or partner present, and 30.0% were households with a female householder and no spouse or partner present. About 37.0% of all households were made up of individuals and 17.0% had someone living alone who was 65 years of age or older.

There were 2,441 housing units, of which 8.8% were vacant. The homeowner vacancy rate was 2.1% and the rental vacancy rate was 13.5%.

Racial composition as of the 2020 census
Race	Number	Percent
White	4,263	83.6%
Black or African American	56	1.1%
American Indian and Alaska Native	332	6.5%
Asian	47	0.9%
Native Hawaiian and Other Pacific Islander	1	0.0%
Some other race	60	1.2%
Two or more races	343	6.7%
Hispanic or Latino (of any race)	245	4.8%

=== 2010 census ===
As of the census of 2010, there were 5,254 people, 2,265 households, and 1,341 families residing in the city. The population density was 1,000.8 inhabitants per square mile (386.4/km^{2}). There were 2,465 housing units at an average density of 469.5 per square mile (181.3/km^{2}). The racial makeup of the city was 87.8% White, 0.6% African American, 6.6% Native American, 0.7% Asian, 0.6% from other races, and 3.6% from two or more races. Hispanic or Latino people of any race were 3.3% of the population.

There were 2,265 households, of which 28.9% had children under the age of 18 living with them, 42.8% were married couples living together, 12.1% had a female householder with no husband present, 4.3% had a male householder with no wife present, and 40.8% were non-families. 37.0% of all households were made up of individuals, and 17.9% had someone living alone who was 65 years of age or older. The average household size was 2.23 and the average family size was 2.89.

The median age in the city was 42.1 years. 24.3% of residents were under the age of 18; 7.3% were between the ages of 18 and 24; 21.4% were from 25 to 44; 26.4% were from 45 to 64; and 20.7% were 65 years of age or older. The gender makeup of the city was 47.7% male and 52.3% female.

=== 2000 census ===
As of the census of 2000, there were 5,459 people, 2,266 households, and 1,389 families residing in the city. The population density was 1,167.1 inhabitants per square mile (450.6/km^{2}). There were 2,377 housing units at an average density of 508.2 per square mile (196.2/km^{2}). The racial makeup of the city was 93.28% White, 0.22% African American, 3.88% Native American, 0.48% Asian, 0.04% Pacific Islander, 0.77% from other races, and 1.34% from two or more races. Hispanic or Latino people of any race were 1.92% of the population.

There were 2,266 households, out of which 30.1% had children under the age of 18 living with them, 49.2% were married couples living together, 9.2% had a female householder with no husband present, and 38.7% were non-families. 34.2% of all households were made up of individuals, and 16.5% had someone living alone who was 65 years of age or older. The average household size was 2.29 and the average family size was 2.94.

In the city, the population was spread out, with 25.0% under the age of 18, 6.9% from 18 to 24, 25.6% from 25 to 44, 23.1% from 45 to 64, and 19.3% who were 65 years of age or older. The median age was 40 years. For every 100 females, there were 92.2 males. For every 100 females age 18 and over, there were 87.1 males.

The median income for a household in the city was $38,812, and the median income for a family was $52,589. Males had a median income of $31,776 versus $24,085 for females. The per capita income for the city was $22,279. About 5.3% of families and 7.5% of the population were below the poverty line, including 6.3% of those under age 18 and 10.8% of those age 65 or over.

== Politics ==
Presidential election results 1960–2020

Precinct general election results
Year	Republican	Democratic	Third parties
2020	59.9% 1,508	37.9% 955	2.2% 56
2016	59.8% 1,411	31.5% 743	8.7% 206
2012	52.2% 1,278	45.0% 1,101	2.8% 69
2008	52.3% 1,312	45.0% 1,128	2.7% 67
2004	56.2% 1,483	42.1% 1,110	1.7% 45
2000	54.4% 1,383	38.6% 981	7.0% 179
1996	46.1% 1,105	42.1% 1,009	11.8% 285
1992	40.1% 1,105	31.2% 860	28.7% 793
1988	64.3% 1,542	35.7% 856	0.0% 0
1984	68.6% 1,781	31.4% 817	0.0% 0
1980	61.7% 1,638	29.7% 789	8.6% 228
1976	58.9% 1,552	38.7% 1,019	2.4% 64
1972	70.4% 1,763	27.2% 681	2.4% 60
1968	62.3% 1,393	35.4% 791	2.3% 52
1964	56.2% 1,214	43.7% 944	0.1% 1
1960	71.9% 1,572	28.0% 612	0.1% 2

== Media ==
=== Television ===
Channel	Callsign	Affiliation	Branding	Subchannels		Owner
(virtual)	Callsign	Affiliation	Branding	Channel	Programming	Owner
4.1	K33LB-D (WCCO Translator)	CBS	WCCO 4	4.2	Start TV	Redwood Falls TV Improvement Corporation
5.1	K35NY-D (KSTP Translator)	ABC	5 Eyewitness News	5.7	Heroes & Icons	Redwood Falls TV Improvement Corporation
5.2	K28LL-D (KSTC Translator)	Ind.	45 TV	5.3; 5.4; 5.6	Me-TV; Antenna TV; This TV	Redwood Falls TV Improvement Corporation
9.2	K19CV-D (WFTC Translator)	MyNet	FOX 9 Plus	9.3; 9.1	Movies! FOX (KMSP)	Redwood Falls TV Improvement Corporation
10.1	KWCM	PBS	Pioneer Public TV	10.2; 10.3; 10.4; 10.5	Create; Minnesota Channel; World; PBS Kids	West Central Minnesota Educational TV Corporation
11.4	K22KU-D (KARE Translator)	NBC	KARE 11	11.5; 11.6; 11.7	Court TV; Justice Network; Quest	Redwood Falls TV Improvement Corporation
12.1	KEYC-TV	CBS	KEYC	12.2	Fox	Gray Television
15.1	K15LS-D	CNN				Redwood Falls TV Improvement Corporation
16.1	K16MV-D	Grit		16.2; 16.3; 16.4	Heartland; AMGTV; Action	Redwood Falls TV Improvement Corporation
25.1	K25II-D	Bally Sports North				Redwood Falls TV Improvement Corporation
29.1	K29MQ-D	TBS				Redwood Falls TV Improvement Corporation
36.1	K36KW-D	RFD				Redwood Falls TV Improvement Corporation
41.1	K17BV-D (KPXM Translator)	ION	ION	41.2; 41.3; 41.4; 41.5; 41.6	Qubo; Ion Plus; ION Shop; QVC; HSN	Redwood Falls TV Improvement Corporation
43.1	KRWF (KSTP Satellite)	ABC	5 Eyewitness News	43.2; 43.3	45TV; MeTV	Hubbard Broadcasting
