= Waltham =

Waltham may refer to:

== Business ==
- Waltham Watch Company, American watch manufacturer, pioneer in the industrialisation of the manufacturing of watch movements
- The Waltham system, industrial efficiency system

== Music ==
- Waltham (band), American rock band

== Places ==
=== Canada ===
- Waltham, Quebec

=== England ===
- Bishop's Waltham, Hampshire
- Great Waltham, Essex
  - Little Waltham, nearby
- London Borough of Waltham Forest
  - including Walthamstow
    - that includes Walthamstow Village
- Waltham, Kent
- Waltham, Lincolnshire
  - New Waltham, nearby
- Waltham Abbey, Essex, the town
  - taking its name from Waltham Abbey (abbey)
- Waltham Bury, Essex
- Waltham Chase, Hampshire
- Waltham Cross, Hertfordshire
- Waltham Holy Cross Urban District, a former urban district in Essex
- Waltham (hundred), a disused hundred in Essex
- Waltham on the Wolds, Leicestershire
  - Waltham on the Wolds and Thorpe Arnold, related civil parish
  - Waltham transmitting station, nearby
- Waltham St Lawrence, a small village in Berkshire
- White Waltham, a village in Berkshire

=== New Zealand ===
- Waltham, New Zealand

=== United States ===
- Waltham, Maine
- Waltham, Massachusetts
- Waltham, Minnesota
- Waltham, Vermont
- Waltham Township, Minnesota

== Transportation ==
- Waltham (automobile), a defunct automobile manufacturer
- Waltham station, a railroad station in Waltham, Massachusetts, United States
- Waltham railway station (England), a former station in Waltham, Lincolnshire, England
- Waltham Cross railway station, in Waltham Cross, Hertfordshire, England
- Waltham-on-the-Wolds railway station, a former station in Waltham on the Wolds, Leicestershire, England
