= Waltham Township =

Waltham Township may refer to the following places in the United States:

- Waltham Township, LaSalle County, Illinois
- Waltham Township, Mower County, Minnesota
- Waltham Township, Kay County, Oklahoma

See also

- Waltham (disambiguation)
