= Eleanor cross =

English stone crosses erected in 1291–95

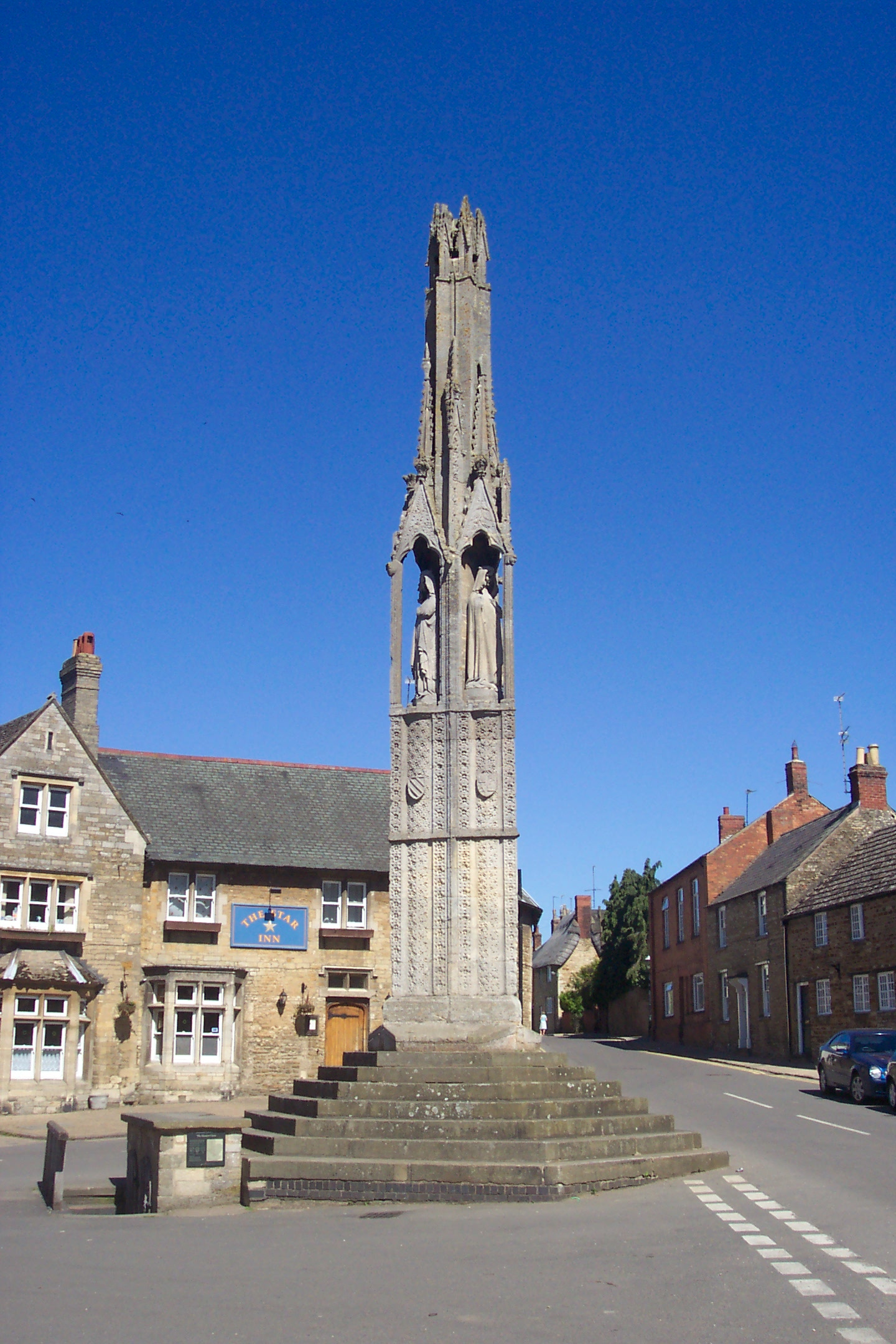
Geddington, Northamptonshire, the best-preserved of the original crosses, and the only triangular one

Sites of the Eleanor crosses

The Eleanor crosses were a series of twelve tall and lavishly decorated stone monuments erected in a line down part of the east of England. King Edward I had them built between 1291 and about 1295 in memory of his wife Eleanor of Castile. The King and Queen had been married for 36 years and she stayed by the King's side through his many travels. While on a royal progress, she died in Harby, Nottinghamshire, in November 1290. The crosses, erected in her memory, marked the nightly resting-places along the route taken when her body was transported to Westminster Abbey near the City of London.

Whilst it is commonly accepted that there were crosses atop the monuments, this has never been proven. Theories of this date back to Victorian England, where people embellished stories of the past to make them sound more interesting. A more likely reason for the monuments being called "crosses" was due to their placement, as they were usually placed on crossroads.

The crosses stood at Lincoln, Grantham and Stamford, all in Lincolnshire; Geddington and Hardingstone in Northamptonshire; Stony Stratford in Buckinghamshire; Woburn and Dunstable in Bedfordshire; St Albans and Waltham (now Waltham Cross) in Hertfordshire; Cheapside in London; and Charing (now Charing Cross) in Westminster.

Three of the medieval monuments – those at Geddington, Hardingstone and Waltham Cross – survive more or less intact; but the other nine, other than a few fragments, are lost. Some were destroyed during the Reformation and Civil War, due to their Catholic associations. The largest and most ornate of the twelve was at Charing Cross. Several memorials and elaborated reproductions of the crosses have been erected, including the Queen Eleanor Memorial Cross at Charing Cross Station (built 1865), 200 metres (220 yd) northeast – along the Strand roadway – of the original site of the Charing Cross.

Edward I's use of architecture is known for containing an element of propaganda. In her lifetime, Eleanor had been unpopular with the public, particularly for her acquisitiveness regarding land holdings, which had been associated with the abuse of Jewish loans, attracting strong criticism from the church. The series of Crosses played a role in rehabilitating Eleanor's image as an idealised Queen and woman, as well as projecting royal and spiritual power. The Lincoln tomb of a child falsely claimed to be martyred by Jews is widely assumed to form part of the series, positioning Eleanor and Edward as defenders against the recently expelled Jews. The series has architectural parallels, most notably the 1271 montjoies marking the funeral route of King Louis IX of France, which were designed as part of an attempt to promote his canonisation as a saint.

== Background ==
=== Procession and burials ===
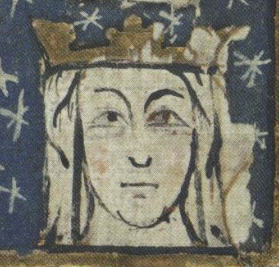
Eleanor of Castile, Queen Consort of England 1272–1290

Eleanor of Castile died on 28 November 1290 at Harby, Nottinghamshire. Edward and Eleanor loved each other and much like his father, Edward was very devoted to his wife and remained faithful to her throughout their married lives. He was deeply affected by her death and displayed his grief by erecting twelve so-called Eleanor crosses, one at each place where her funeral cortège stopped for the night.

Following her death the body of Queen Eleanor was carried to Lincoln, about 7 miles (11 km) away, where she was embalmed – probably either at the Gilbertine priory of St Katherine in the south of the city, or at the priory of the Dominicans. Her viscera, with the exception of her heart, were buried in the Angel Choir of Lincoln Cathedral on 3 December. Eleanor's other remains were carried to London, a journey of about 180 miles (290 km), that lasted 12 days. Her body was buried in Westminster Abbey, at the feet of her father-in-law King Henry III on 17 December; while her heart was buried in the church of the London Dominicans' priory at Blackfriars (a house that she and Edward had heavily patronised) on 19 December, along with the heart of her young son Alphonso, Earl of Chester, who had died in 1284, and that of John de Vesci, who had died in 1289.

=== Purpose and parallels ===
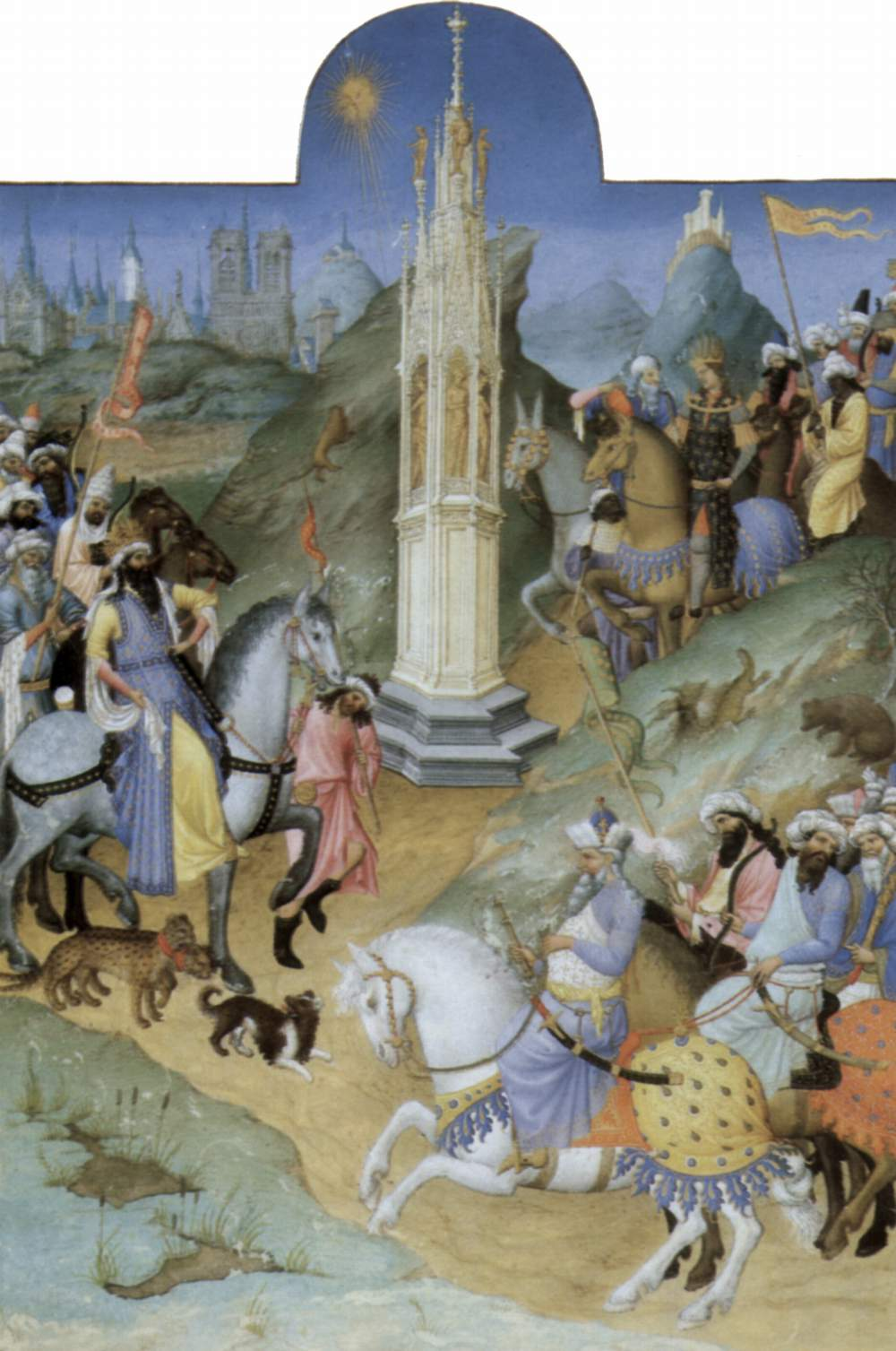
Illumination from the Très Riches Heures du Duc de Berry (c. 1412–1416) depicting a cross possibly representing one of the montjoies of Louis IX

Eleanor's crosses appear to have been intended in part as expressions of royal power; and in part as cenotaphs to encourage prayers for her soul from travellers. On the pedestal of each was inscribed the phrase Orate pro anima ("Pray for [her] soul"). Eleanor's reputation had been tarnished by her trafficking in Jewish loans and land acquisition in her own lifetime. Favourable mentions in contemporary chronicles do not emerge until the succession of her son. The Crosses have been an important element in forming her reputation as an idealised Queen, focusing attention on her relationship with Edward.

It was not unknown for memorial crosses to be constructed in the middle ages, although they were normally isolated instances and relatively simple in design. A cross in the Strand, just outside the City of London, was said to have been erected by William II in memory of his mother, Queen Matilda (d. 1083). Henry III erected one at Merton, Surrey, for his cousin the Earl of Surrey (d. 1240). Another was erected at Reading for Edward I's sister Beatrice (d. 1275). Yet another, almost contemporary with the Eleanor crosses, was erected near Windsor for Edward's mother, Eleanor of Provence (d.1291).

The closest precedent for the Eleanor crosses, and almost certainly their model, was the series of nine crosses known as montjoies erected along the funeral route of King Louis IX of France in 1271. These were elaborate structures incorporating sculptural representations of the King, and were erected in part to promote his canonisation (a campaign that in 1297 succeeded). Eleanor's crosses never aspired to this last purpose, but in design were even larger and more ornate than the montjoies, being of at least three rather than two tiers.

Eleanor has subsequently been an unclear and contested figure in English history. Since her death, she has been portrayed in both positive and negative lights, with romantic and aggressive portrayals, focusing on her relationship with Edward or her role as a Spanish, foreign monarch.

=== Commemoration ===
==== Tomb monuments ====
Both the burial of Eleanor's body at Westminster and her visceral burial at Lincoln were subsequently marked by ornate effigial monuments, both with similar life-sized gilt bronze effigies cast by the goldsmith William Torell. Her heart burial at the Blackfriars was marked by another elaborate monument, but probably not with a life-sized effigy. The Blackfriars monument was lost following the priory's dissolution in 1538. The Lincoln monument was destroyed in the 17th century, but was replaced in 1891 with a reconstruction, not on the site of the original. The Westminster Abbey monument survives.

==== Form and content of the crosses ====
The twelve crosses were erected to mark the places where Eleanor's funeral procession had stopped overnight. They take three part form, with the royal arms in the lower part, and statues of Eleanor above. In these, her crowned head is bowed, and she holds a sceptre. Her posture draws on Marian imagery to suggest grace and submission, and the imagery echoes that of her tombs. According to historian Paul Binski, their "elaborate display" conveys power as part of an authoritarian project; her statues' gaze should be interpreted as active, gazing out from a protected height onto her territory. They had a function that was both spiritual and temporal, binding localities with the source of power on earth, at Westminster.

===== Construction of the crosses =====
Their construction is documented in the executors' account rolls, which survive from 1291 to March 1294, but not thereafter. By the end of that period, the crosses at Lincoln, Hardingstone, Stony Stratford, Woburn, Dunstable, St Albans and Waltham were complete or nearly so, and those at Cheapside and Charing in progress; but those at Grantham, Stamford and Geddington apparently not yet begun. It is assumed that these last three were erected in 1294 or 1295, and that they were certainly finished before the financial crisis of 1297 which brought a halt to royal building works. A number of artists worked on the crosses, as the account rolls show, with a distinction generally drawn between the main structures, made locally under the direction of master masons appointed by the King, and the statues of Eleanor, made of Caen stone, and other sculptural details, brought from London. Master masons included Richard of Crundale, Roger of Crundale (probably Richard's brother), Michael of Canterbury, Richard of Stow, John of Battle and Nicholas Dymenge. Sculptors included Alexander of Abingdon and William of Ireland, both of whom had worked at Westminster Abbey, who were paid £3 6s. 8d. apiece for the statues; and Ralph of Chichester.

==== Shrine of Little St Hugh ====
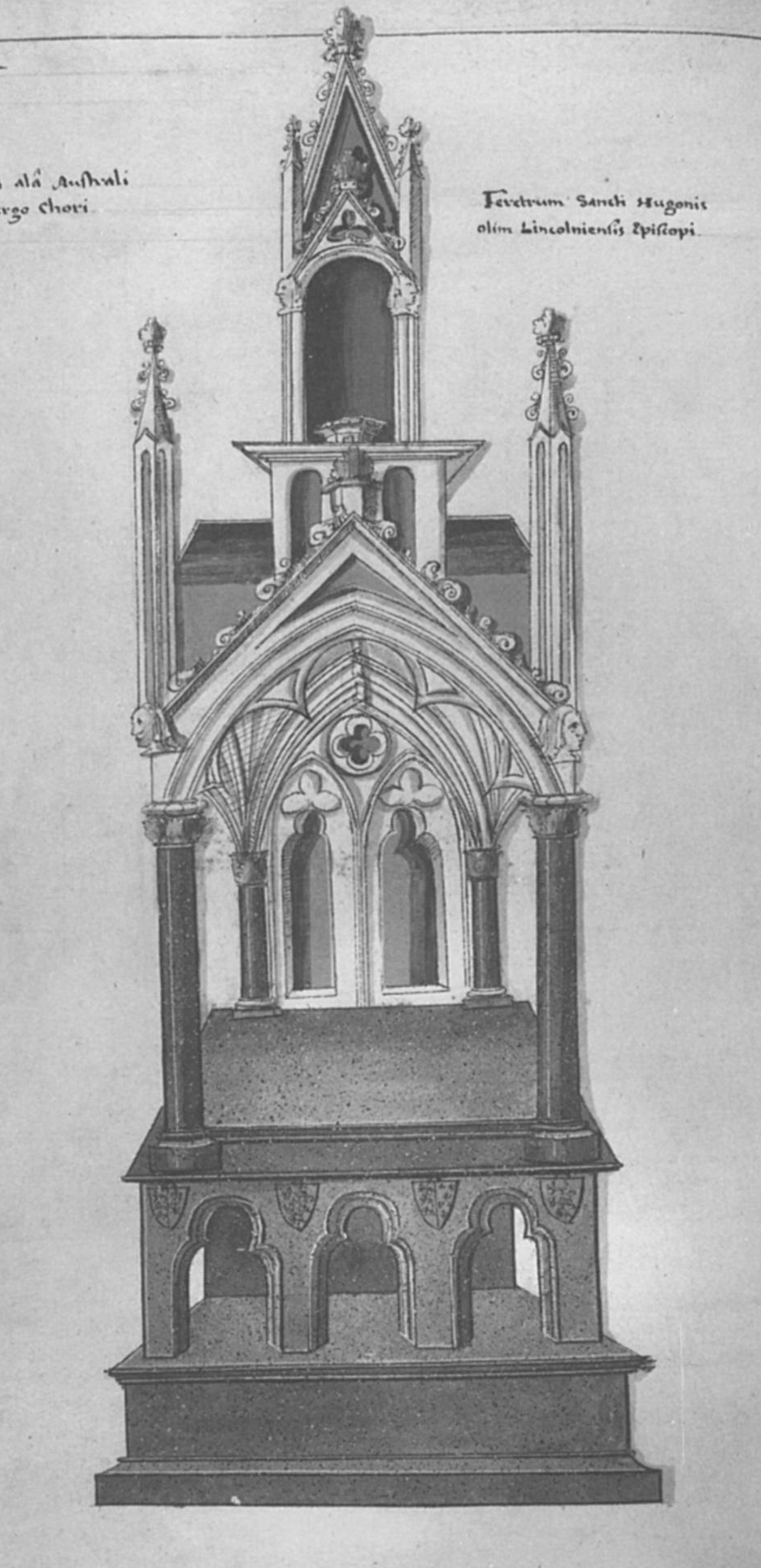
Drawing of the Shrine of Little St Hugh, Lincoln Cathedral, William Dugdale, 1641

The tomb of Little Saint Hugh of Lincoln was rebuilt around the same time, probably by the same craftsmen and designers as the Eleanor crosses. It featured the royal arms, and decoration commemorating Eleanor. David Stocker believes that the shrine "displays such close acquaintance with the Eleanor crosses that it has to be considered alongside them."

The cult of Little St Hugh venerated a false ritual murder allegation against the Jewish community of Lincoln, and was revived after the Expulsion of the Jews in 1290. Eleanor had been widely disliked for large-scale purchase of Jewish bonds, with the aim of requisitioning the lands and properties of those indebted. It has been suggested that the proximity of the shrine's design to the Eleanor crosses was deliberate, in order to position Edward and Eleanor as protectors of Christians against supposed Jewish criminality. According to historian Joe Hillaby, the crosses and tomb amounted to a "propaganda coup".

== Destruction, restoration and the Gothic revival ==
The crosses suffered greatly during the Reformation and the English Civil Wars, as they represented a Catholic worldview, of public iconography.

Interest in English Gothic styles of architecture grew around the start of the Industrial Revolution. This coincided with a revival of interest in Eleanor as an idealised Queen. The design and form of the Eleanor crosses was used to create new memorials, including commemorations of highly Protestant themes, while a number of the original Crosses including Charing Cross were recreated.

== Locations ==
=== Lincoln ===
The surviving fragment of the Lincoln cross

(53°12′51″N 00°32′47″W)
Eleanor rested on the first night of the journey at the Priory of Saint Katherine without Lincoln and her viscera were buried in Lincoln Cathedral on 3 December 1290. The Lincoln cross was built between 1291 and 1293 by Richard of Stow at a total recorded cost of over £120, with sculptures by William of Ireland (also named as William "Imaginator", or image-maker). John Leland, in the early 1540s, noted that "a litle without Barre [gate] is a very fair crosse and large". It stood at Swine Green, St Catherine's, an area just outside the city at the southern end of the High Street, but had disappeared by the early 18th century. The only surviving piece is the lower half of one of the statues, rediscovered in the 19th century and now in the grounds of Lincoln Castle.

=== Grantham ===
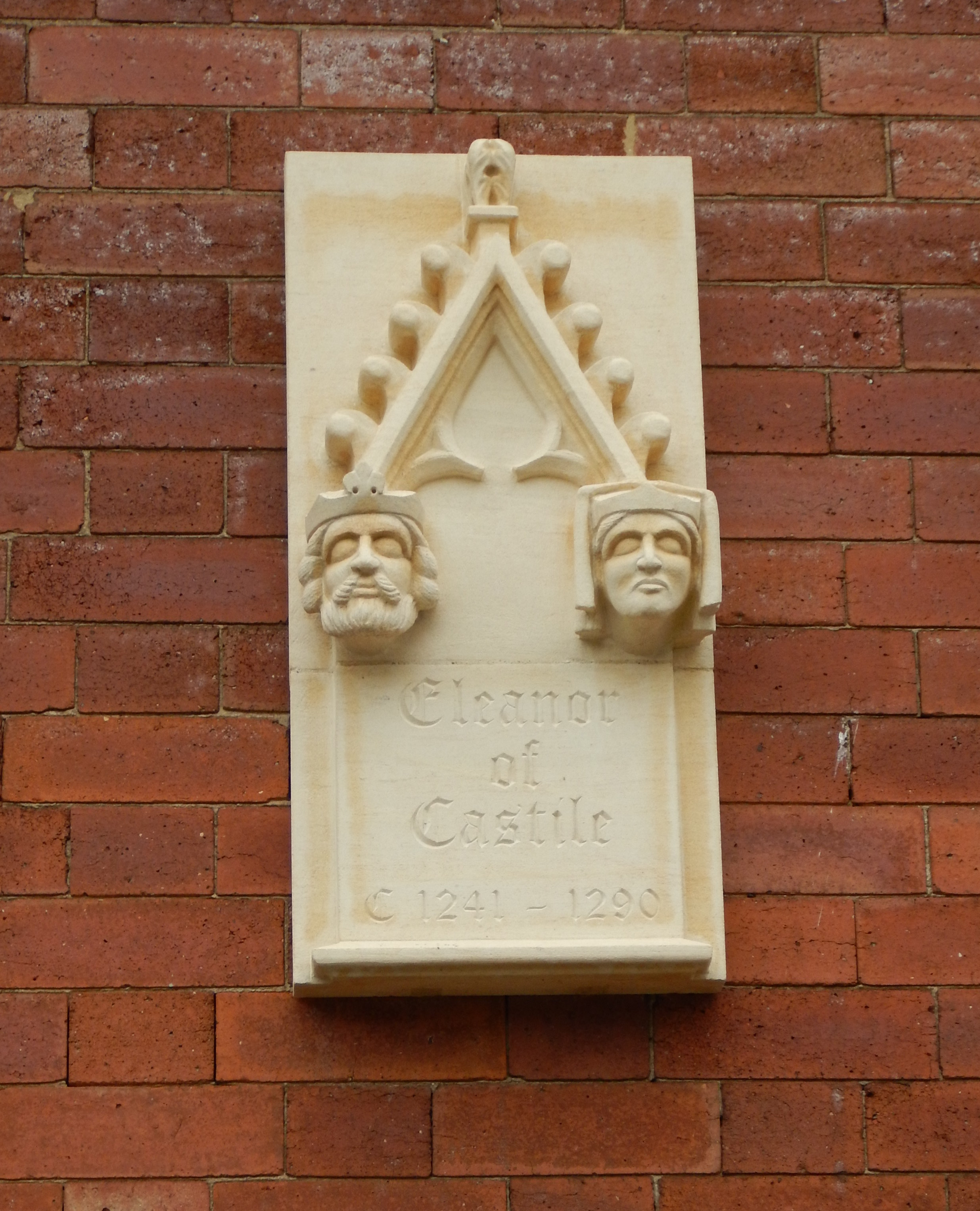
2015 plaque in Grantham

(52°54′37″N 00°38′25″W)
Eleanor's bier spent the night of 4 December 1290 in Grantham, Lincolnshire. The master mason for the cross here is not known: it was probably constructed in 1294 or 1295. It stood at the upper end of the High Street. It was pulled down during the Civil War, but in February 1647 Grantham Corporation ordered that any stones that could be traced should be recovered for public use. No part is known to survive, but it is conceivable that the substantial steps of the standing Market Cross comprise stones that originally belonged to the Eleanor Cross. A letter from the 18th-century antiquary William Stukeley (now untraceable) is alleged to have stated that he had one of the lions from Eleanor's coats of arms in his garden.

A modern relief stone plaque to Eleanor was installed at the Grantham Guildhall in 2015.

=== Stamford ===
(52°39′22″N 00°29′37″W)
Eleanor's bier spent the night of 5 December 1290, and possibly also that of 6 December, in Stamford, Lincolnshire. The master mason for the cross here is not known: it was probably constructed in 1294 or 1295. There is conflicting evidence about its precise location, but it is now generally agreed that it stood just outside the town on the Great North Road (modern Casterton Road, the B1081), in what is today the Foxdale area.

The cross was in decay by the early 17th century, and in 1621 the town council ordered some restoration work, although it is unknown whether this was carried out. Richard Symonds reported in 1645: "In the hill before ye come into the towne, stands a lofty large crosse built by Edward III [sic], in memory of Elianor his queene, whose corps rested there coming from the North." In 1646 Richard Butcher, the Town Clerk, described it as "so defaced, that only the Ruins appeare to my eye". It had probably been destroyed by 1659, and certainly by the early 18th century.

In 1745, William Stukeley attempted to excavate the remains of the cross, and succeeded in finding its hexagonal base and recovering several fragments of the superstructure. His sketch of the top portion, which seems to have stylistically resembled the Geddington Cross, is found in his diaries in the Bodleian Library, Oxford. A single small fragment from among Stukeley's finds, a carved Purbeck marble rose, was rediscovered in about 1976, and identified as part of the cross in 1993. Following the closure of Stamford Museum in 2011, this fragment is now displayed in the Discover Stamford area at the town's library.

A modern monument was erected in Stamford in 2009 in commemoration of Eleanor: see Replicas and imitations below.

=== Geddington ===
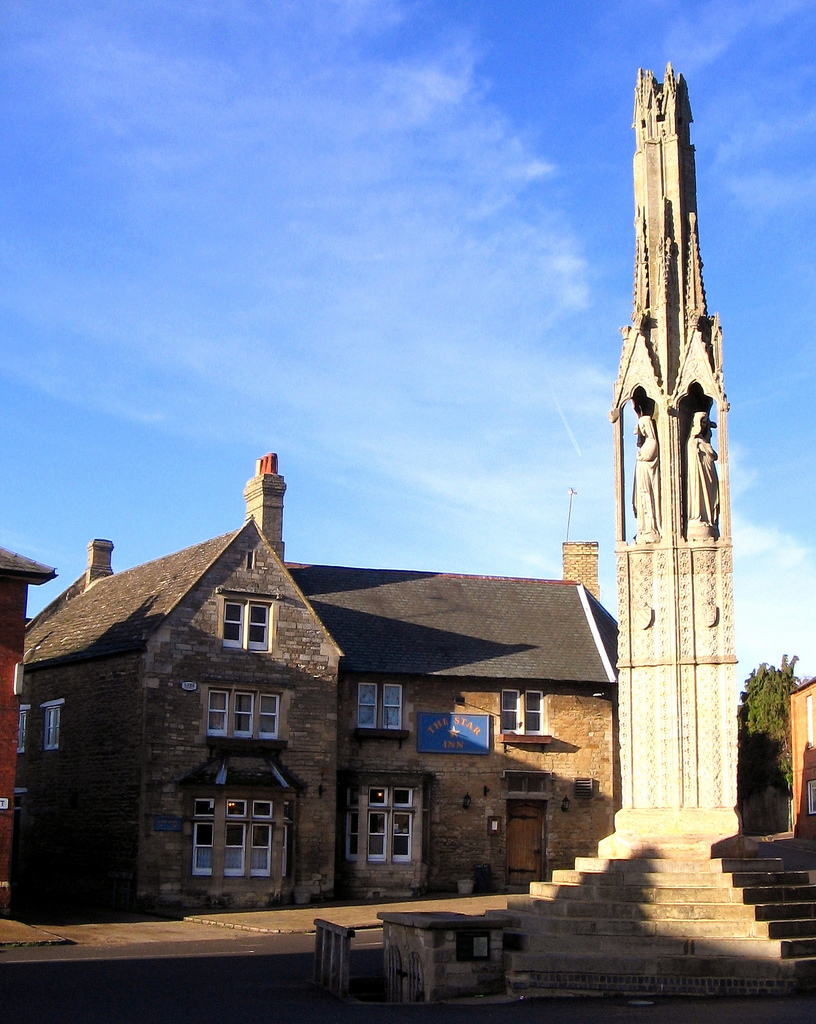
The Geddington cross

(52°26′15″N 00°41′07″W)
Eleanor's bier spent the night of either 6 or 7 December 1290, or possibly both, in Geddington, Northamptonshire. The master mason for the cross here is not known: it was probably constructed in 1294 or 1295. It was recorded by William Camden in 1607; and still stands in the centre of the village, the best-preserved of the three survivors. It is unique among the three in having a triangular plan, and a taller and more slender profile with a lower tier entirely covered with rosette diapering, instead of the arch-and-gable motif with tracery which appears on both the others; and canopied statues surmounted by a slender hexagonal pinnacle. It is possible that the other northern crosses (Lincoln, Grantham and Stamford) were in a similar relatively simple style; and that this reflects either the need to cut back expenditure in the latter stages of the project for financial reasons, or a decision taken at the planning stage to make the crosses progressively larger and more ornate as the sequence proceeded south.

An engraving of the Geddington cross (drawn by Jacob Schnebbelie and engraved by James Basire) was published by the Society of Antiquaries in its Vetusta Monumenta series in 1791. It was "discreetly" restored in 1892.

=== Hardingstone, Northampton ===
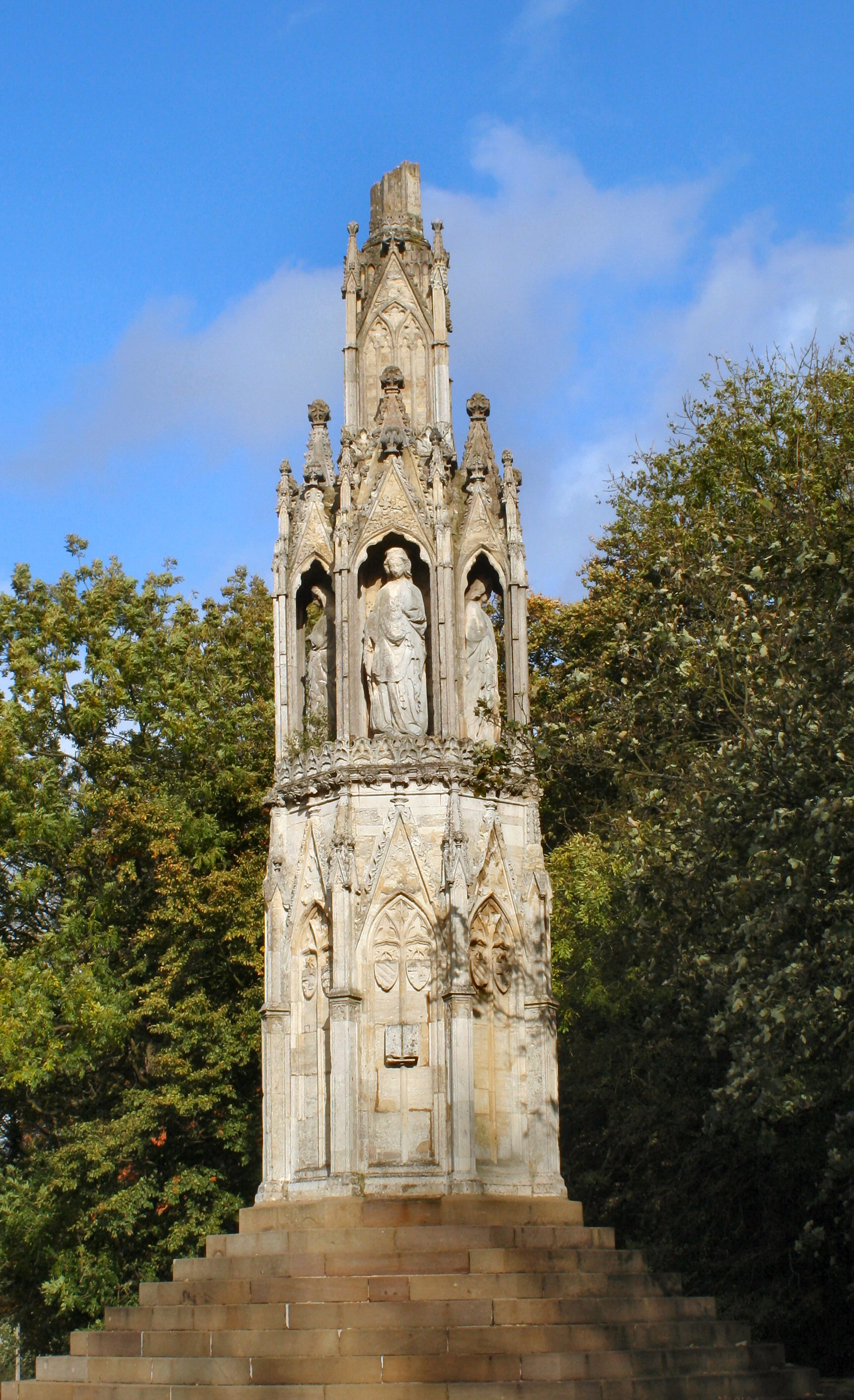
The Hardingstone cross

(52°13′02″N 00°53′50″W)
Eleanor's bier spent the night of 8 December 1290, and perhaps also that of 7 December, at Hardingstone, on the outskirts of Northampton. The cross here was constructed between 1291 and 1292 by John of Battle, at a total recorded cost of over £100. William of Ireland and Ralph of Chichester carved the statues. A causeway leading from the town to the cross was constructed by Robert son of Henry. The cross is still standing, close to Delapré Abbey, on the side of the A508 leading out of Northampton, and just north of the junction with the A45. The King stayed nearby at Northampton Castle.

The monument is octagonal in shape and set on steps; the present steps are replacements. It is built in three tiers, and originally had a crowning terminal, presumably a cross. The terminal appears to have gone by 1460: there is mention of a "headless cross" at the site from which Thomas Bourchier, Archbishop of Canterbury, watched Margaret of Anjou's flight following the Battle of Northampton. The monument was restored in 1713, to mark the Peace of Utrecht and the end of the War of the Spanish Succession, and this work included the fitting of a new terminal in the form of a Maltese cross. Further repairs were undertaken in 1762. At a later restoration in 1840, under the direction of Edward Blore, the Maltese cross was replaced by the picturesque broken shaft which is seen today. Later, less intrusive restorations were undertaken in 1877 and 1986. Further restoration work was completed in 2019.

The bottom tier of the monument has carvings of open books. These probably included painted inscriptions of Eleanor's biography and of prayers for her soul to be said by viewers, now lost.

John Leland, in the early 1540s, recorded it as "a right goodly crosse, caullid, as I remembre, the Quenes Crosse", although he seems to have associated it with the 1460 Battle of Northampton. It is also referred to by Daniel Defoe in his Tour thro' the Whole Island of Great Britain, in reporting the Great Fire of Northampton in 1675: "... a townsman being at Queen's Cross upon a hill on the south side of the town, about two miles (3.2 km) off, saw the fire at one end of the town then newly begun, and that before he could get to the town it was burning at the remotest end, opposite where he first saw it."

Celia Fiennes in 1697 describes it as "a Cross, a mile off the town call'd High-Cross – it stands just in the middle of England – its all stone 12 stepps which runs round it, above that is the stone carv'd finely and there are 4 large Nitches about the middle, in each is the statue of some queen at length which encompasses it with other carvings as garnish, and so it rises less and less to the top like a tower or Piramidy."

An engraving of the Hardingstone cross (drawn by Jacob Schnebbelie and engraved by James Basire) was published by the Society of Antiquaries in its Vetusta Monumenta series in 1791.

=== Stony Stratford ===
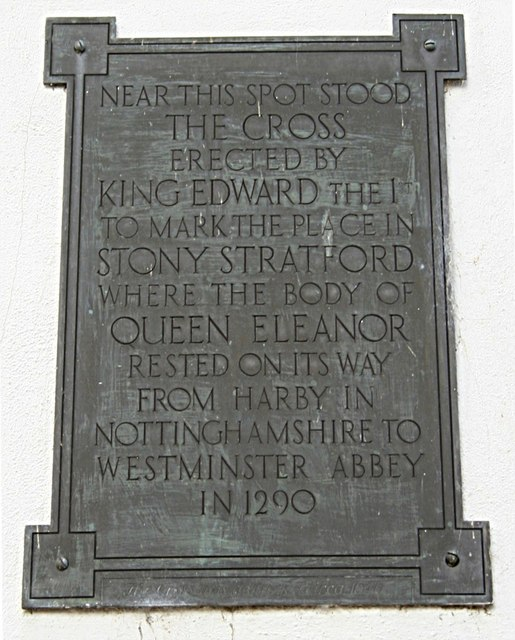
Plaque in Stony Stratford

(plaque at 52°03′32″N 00°51′24″W)

Eleanor's bier spent the night of 9 December 1290 at Stony Stratford, Buckinghamshire. The cross here was built between 1291 and 1293 by John of Battle at a total recorded cost of over £100. The supplier of the statues is uncertain, but some smaller carvings were provided by Ralph of Chichester. The cross stood at the lower end of the town, towards the River Ouse, on Watling Street (now the High Street), although its exact location is debated. It is said to have been of a tall elegant design (perhaps similar to that at Geddington). It was described by William Camden in 1607 as minus elegantem ("none of the fairest"), suggesting that it was by this date in a state of decay. It is said to have been demolished in about 1643. In 1735, William Hartley, a man of nearly 80, could remember only the base still standing. Any trace has now vanished.

The cross is commemorated by a brass plaque on the wall of 157 High Street.

=== Woburn ===
(approximately at 51°59′20″N 00°37′10″W)

Eleanor's bier spent the night of 10 December 1290 at Woburn, Bedfordshire. Work on the cross here started in 1292, later than some of the others, and was completed in the spring of 1293. It was built by John of Battle, at a total recorded cost of over £100. As at Stony Stratford, the supplier of the statues is uncertain, but some of the carvings were provided by Ralph of Chichester. No part of the cross survives. Its precise location, and its fate, are unknown.

=== Dunstable ===
(51°53′10″N 00°31′16″W)

Eleanor's bier spent the night of 11 December 1290 at Dunstable, Bedfordshire. It rested first in the market place, before being carried into Dunstable Priory church, where the canons prayed in an overnight vigil. The cross was built between 1291 and 1293 by John of Battle at a total recorded cost of over £100. Some of the sculpture was supplied by Ralph of Chichester. It is thought to have been located in the middle of the town, probably in the market place, and was reported by William Camden as still standing in 1586. It is said to have been demolished in 1643 by troops under the Earl of Essex. No part survives, although some of the foundations are reported to have been discovered during roadworks at the beginning of the 20th century.

The Eleanor's Cross Shopping Precinct in High Street North contains a modern statue of Eleanor, erected in 1985.

=== St Albans ===
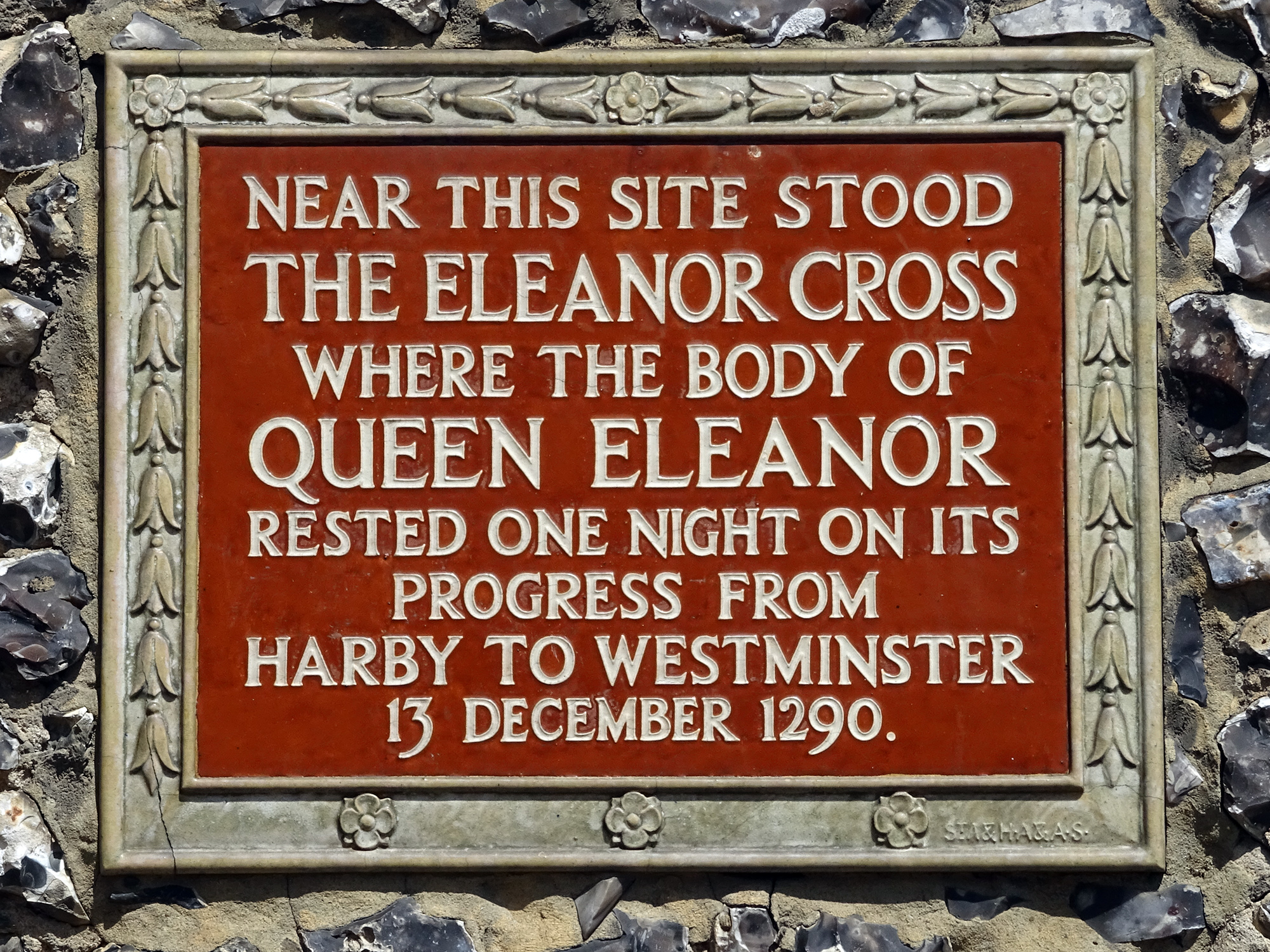
Plaque on the Clock Tower, St Albans

(51°45′04″N 00°20′26″W)

Eleanor's bier spent the night of 12 December 1290 at St Albans, Hertfordshire. The cross here was built between 1291 and 1293 by John of Battle at a total recorded cost of over £100, with some of the sculpture supplied by Ralph of Chichester. It was erected at the south end of the Market Place, and for many years stood in front of the fifteenth-century Clock Tower in the High Street, opposite the Waxhouse Gateway entrance to the Abbey.

In 1596, it was described as "verie stately". However, having fallen into decay, and having probably been further damaged during the Civil War, it was eventually demolished in 1701–02, to be replaced by a market cross. This was demolished in turn in 1810, although the town pump it contained survived a little longer. A drinking fountain was erected on the site by philanthropist Isabella Worley in 1874: this was relocated to Victoria Square nearby in the late 20th century.

A late 19th-century ceramic plaque on the Clock Tower commemorates the Eleanor cross.

=== Waltham (now Waltham Cross) ===
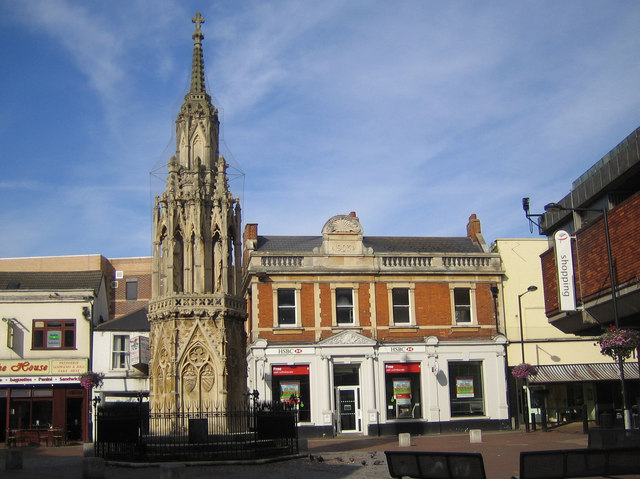
The Waltham cross

(51°41′09″N 00°01′59″W)
Eleanor's bier spent the night of 13 December 1290 in the parish of Cheshunt, Hertfordshire. The cross here was built in about 1291 by Roger of Crundale and Nicholas Dymenge at a total recorded cost of over £110. It probably became known as Waltham Cross because it stood at the way to Waltham Abbey, across the River Lea in Essex, which was clearly visible from its site. The sculpture was by Alexander of Abingdon, with some items supplied by Robert of Corfe. The cross was located outside the village of Waltham, but as the village grew into a town in the 17th and 18th centuries, it began to suffer damage from passing traffic. In 1721, at the instigation of William Stukeley and at the expense of the Society of Antiquaries, two oak bollards were erected "to secure Waltham Cross from injury by carriages". The bollards were subsequently removed by the turnpike commissioners, and in 1757 Stukeley arranged for a protective brick plinth to be erected instead, at the expense of Lord Monson. The cross is still standing, but has been restored on several occasions, in 1832–1834, 1885–1892, 1950–1953, and 1989–90.

The Society of Antiquaries published an engraving of the cross by George Vertue from a drawing by Stukeley in its Vetusta Monumenta series in 1721; and another, engraved by James Basire from a drawing by Jacob Schnebbelie, in the same series in 1791.

The original statues of Eleanor, which were extremely weathered, were replaced by replicas at the 1950s restoration. The originals were kept for some years at Cheshunt Public Library; but they were removed, possibly in the 1980s, and are now held by the Victoria & Albert Museum. A photograph formerly on the Lowewood Museum website shows one of the original statues in front of a staircase at the library.

=== Westcheap (now Cheapside) ===
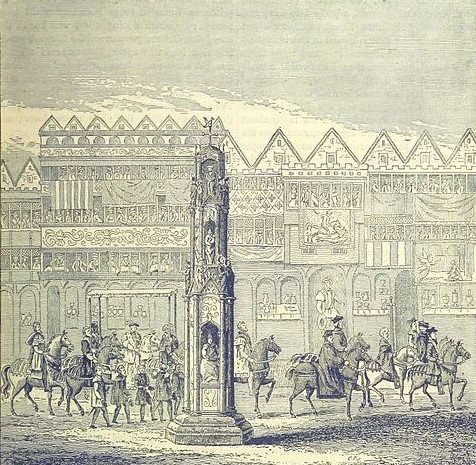
The coronation procession of Edward VI passing the Cheapside cross in 1547: a 19th-century wood engraving based on a lost mural at Cowdray House, Sussex

(51°30′51″N 00°05′41″W)

Eleanor's bier reached the City of London on 14 December 1290, and a site for the cross was selected in Westcheap (now Cheapside). Her heart was buried in the Blackfriars priory on 19 December. The Cheapside cross was built from 1291 onwards by Michael of Canterbury at a total recorded cost of £226 13s. 4d.

Under a licence granted by Henry VI in 1441, the cross was extensively restored or rebuilt in 1484–86. It was subsequently regilded several times in the 16th century on the occasion of coronations and royal visits to the City. John Stow included a detailed account of the cross and its history in his Survay of London of 1598, updating it in 1603.

Although a number of images of the cross and its eventual destruction are known, these all postdate its various refurbishments, and so provide no certain guide to its original appearance. However, the chronicler Walter of Guisborough refers to this and Charing Cross as being fashioned of "marble"; and it is likely that it was similar to the Hardingstone and Waltham Crosses, but even more ornate and boasting some Purbeck marble facings.

The cross came to be regarded as something of a public hazard, both as a traffic obstruction and because of concerns about fragments of stone falling off; while in the post-Reformation period some of its Catholic imagery aroused resentment, and elements were defaced in 1581, 1599 and 1600–01. Matters came to a head during the years leading up to the Civil War. To puritanical reformers, it was identified with Dagon, the ancient god of the Philistines, and was seen as the embodiment of royal and Catholic tradition. At least one riot was fought in its shadow, as opponents of the cross descended upon it to pull it down, and supporters rallied to stop them. After Charles I had fled London to raise an army, the destruction of the cross was almost the first order of business for the Parliamentary Committee for the Demolition of Monuments of Superstition and Idolatry, led by Sir Robert Harley, and it was demolished on 2 May 1643. The downfall of the Cheapside Cross is an important episode of iconoclasm in English history.

Two Purbeck marble fragments of the original cross, displaying shields bearing the royal arms of England and of Castile and León, were recovered in 1838 during reconstruction of the sewer in Cheapside. They are now held by the Museum of London.

=== Charing (now Charing Cross) ===
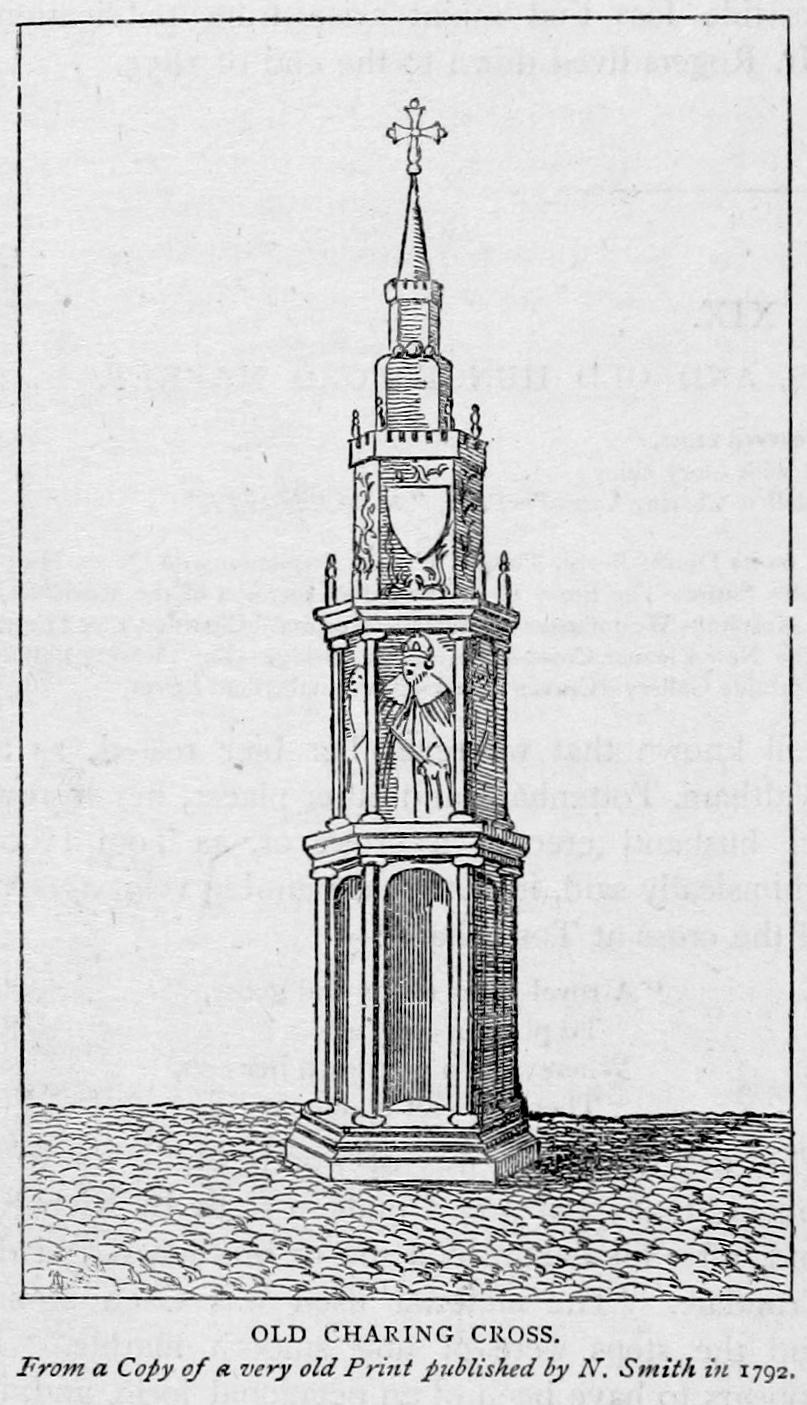
The cross at Charing Cross, Westminster

(51°30′26″N 00°07′39″W) Eleanor's bier spent the final night of its journey, 16 December 1290, in the Royal Mews at Charing, Westminster, a few hundred yards north of Westminster Abbey. The area subsequently became known as Charing Cross. The cross here was the most expensive of the twelve, built of Purbeck marble from 1291 onwards by Richard of Crundale, the senior royal mason, with the sculptures supplied by Alexander of Abingdon, and some items by Ralph de Chichester. Richard died in the autumn of 1293, and the work was completed by Roger of Crundale, probably his brother. The total recorded cost was over £700.

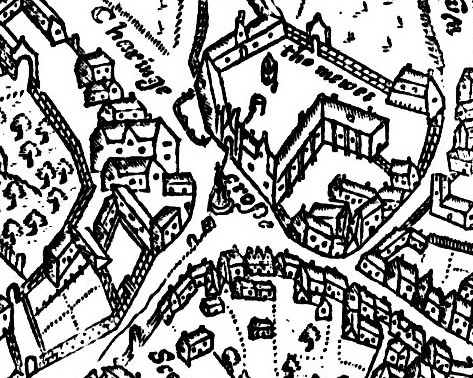
Charing Cross shown on John Norden's map of Westminster, 1593. North-west is to the top.

The cross stood outside the Royal Mews, at the top of what is now Whitehall, and on the south side of what is now Trafalgar Square. John Norden in about 1590 described it as the "most stately" of the series, but by this date so "defaced by antiquity" as to have become "an old weather-beaten monument". It was also noted by William Camden in 1607.

It was ordered to be taken down by Parliament during the Civil War in 1643, and was eventually demolished in 1647. Following the demolition, a contemporary ballad ran:

Undone! undone! the lawyers cry,
They ramble up and down;
We know not the way to Westminster
Now Charing-Cross is down.

After the Restoration of Charles II, an equestrian statue of Charles I by Hubert Le Sueur was erected on the site of the cross in 1675, and this still stands. The location is still known as Charing Cross, and since the early 19th century this point has been regarded as the official centre of London, in legislation and when measuring distances from London.

A new Eleanor cross was erected in 1865 outside Charing Cross railway station, several hundred yards from the original site: see Replicas and imitations below.

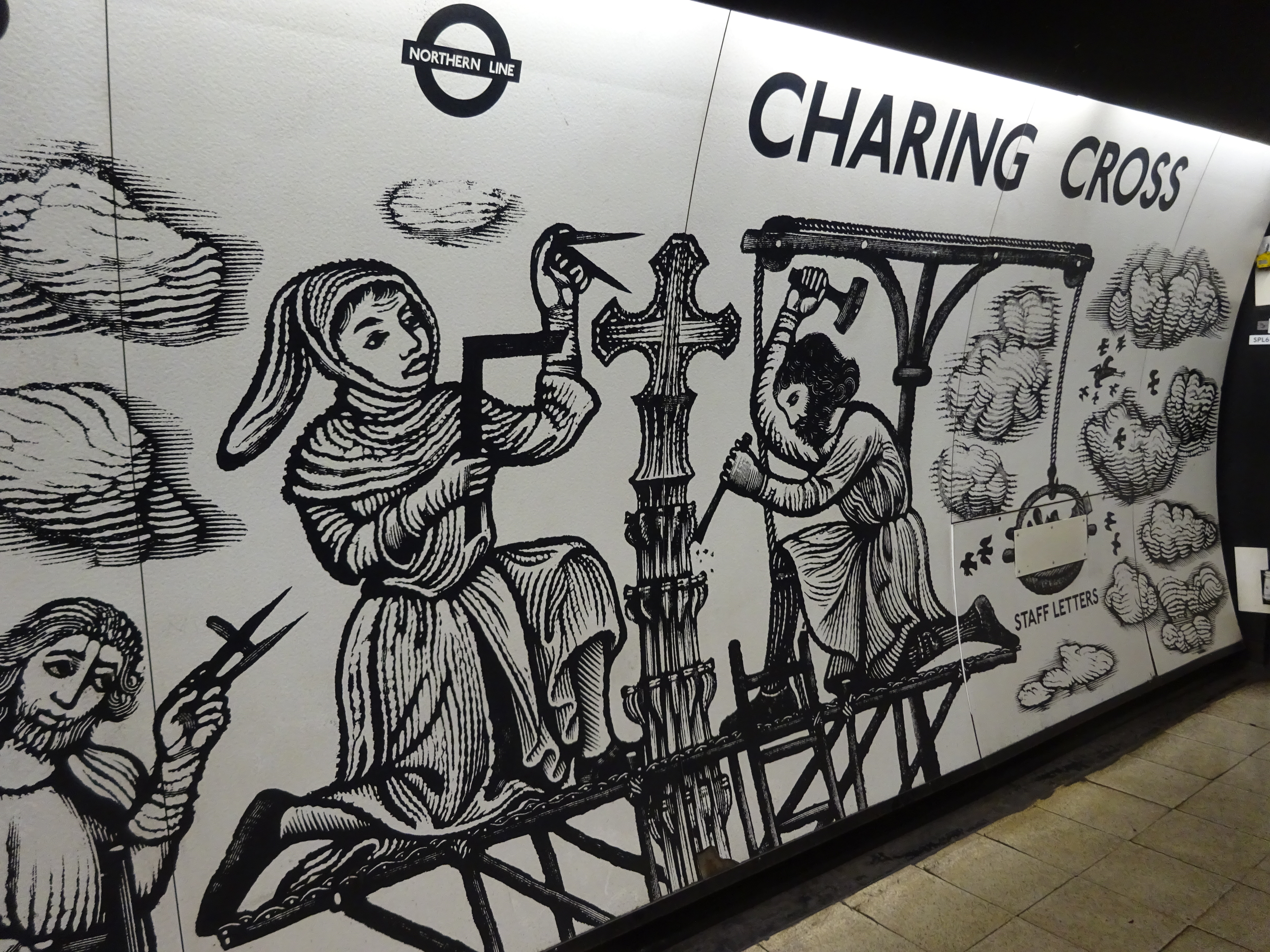
Detail of David Gentleman's mural at Charing Cross underground station

A 100-metre-long (330-foot) mural by David Gentleman on the platform walls of Charing Cross underground station, commissioned by London Transport in 1978, depicts, in the form of wood engravings, the story of the building of the medieval cross by stonemasons and sculptors.

Folk etymology holds that the name Charing derives from French chère reine (dear queen); but the name "Charing" for the area in fact pre-dates Eleanor's death and probably comes from the Anglo-Saxon word ċerring, meaning a bend, as it stands on the outside of a sharp bend in the River Thames (compare Charing in Kent).

== Replicas and imitations ==
During the nineteenth and early twentieth centuries several replica Eleanor crosses, or monuments more loosely inspired by them, were erected.

- The cross at Ilam, Staffordshire, was built in 1840 by Jesse Watts-Russell of Ilam Hall to commemorate his wife, Mary.
- The Martyrs' Memorial in Oxford, commemorating the 16th-century Oxford Martyrs, was erected in 1841–1843 to the designs of George Gilbert Scott.
- The Glastonbury Market Cross, Somerset, was erected in 1846 to the designs of Benjamin Ferrey.
- Banbury Cross, Oxfordshire, was erected in 1859 to commemorate the marriage of Victoria, Princess Royal to Prince Frederick of Prussia: it was designed by John Gibbs.
- The Queen Eleanor Memorial Cross at Charing Cross in London was erected in 1865 outside Charing Cross railway station on the Strand, a few hundred yards to the east of the site of the medieval cross. It does not pretend to be a faithful copy of the original, being larger and more ornate. It stands 70 ft (21 m) high and was commissioned by the South Eastern Railway Company for their newly opened Charing Cross Hotel. The cross was designed by the hotel architect, E. M. Barry, who is also known for his work on Covent Garden. It was constructed by Thomas Earp of Lambeth from Portland stone, Mansfield stone (a fine sandstone) and Aberdeen granite. It was restored to a substantial extent in 2009–10.
- The Ellesmere Memorial at Walkden, Lancashire, was erected in 1868 to the designs of T. G. Jackson to commemorate Harriet (d. 1866), wife of the 1st Earl of Ellesmere. It originally stood at a road junction, but was moved into the churchyard in 1968.
- The Albert Memorial, in Kensington Gardens, London, commissioned by Queen Victoria in memory of her husband Prince Albert, and completed in 1872. It is a far larger structure than any of the Eleanor crosses, but takes inspiration from them. Its architect, Sir Gilbert Scott, claimed to have "adopt[ed] in my design the style at once most congenial with my own feelings, and that of the most touching monuments ever erected in this country to a Royal Consort – the exquisite 'Eleanor Crosses'".
- The Loudoun Monument, Ashby-de-la-Zouch, Leicestershire, was designed by Sir Gilbert Scott and erected in 1879 to commemorate Edith Rawdon-Hastings, 10th Countess of Loudoun (d. 1874), wife of Charles Frederick Abney-Hastings.
- The Sledmere Cross was erected in Sledmere, East Riding of Yorkshire, in 1896–8, commissioned by Sir Tatton Sykes and designed by Temple Lushington Moore. Sir Tatton's son, Sir Mark Sykes, later added engraved brasses to turn it into a war memorial.
- The Queen Victoria Monument, Birkenhead, Wirral, Merseyside, designed by Edmund Kirby, was unveiled in 1905.
- A modern monument inspired by (but not directly modelled on) the lost medieval cross was erected in Stamford in 2009. It was designed by Wolfgang Buttress and sponsored by the Smith of Derby Group; and it stands in Sheepmarket, rather than at the original location. It takes the form of a tall stone and bronze spike: the carved detail is based on the single surviving fragment of the medieval cross. The original location is marked with a limestone block bearing the names and distances to other towns and cities.

=== Gallery ===
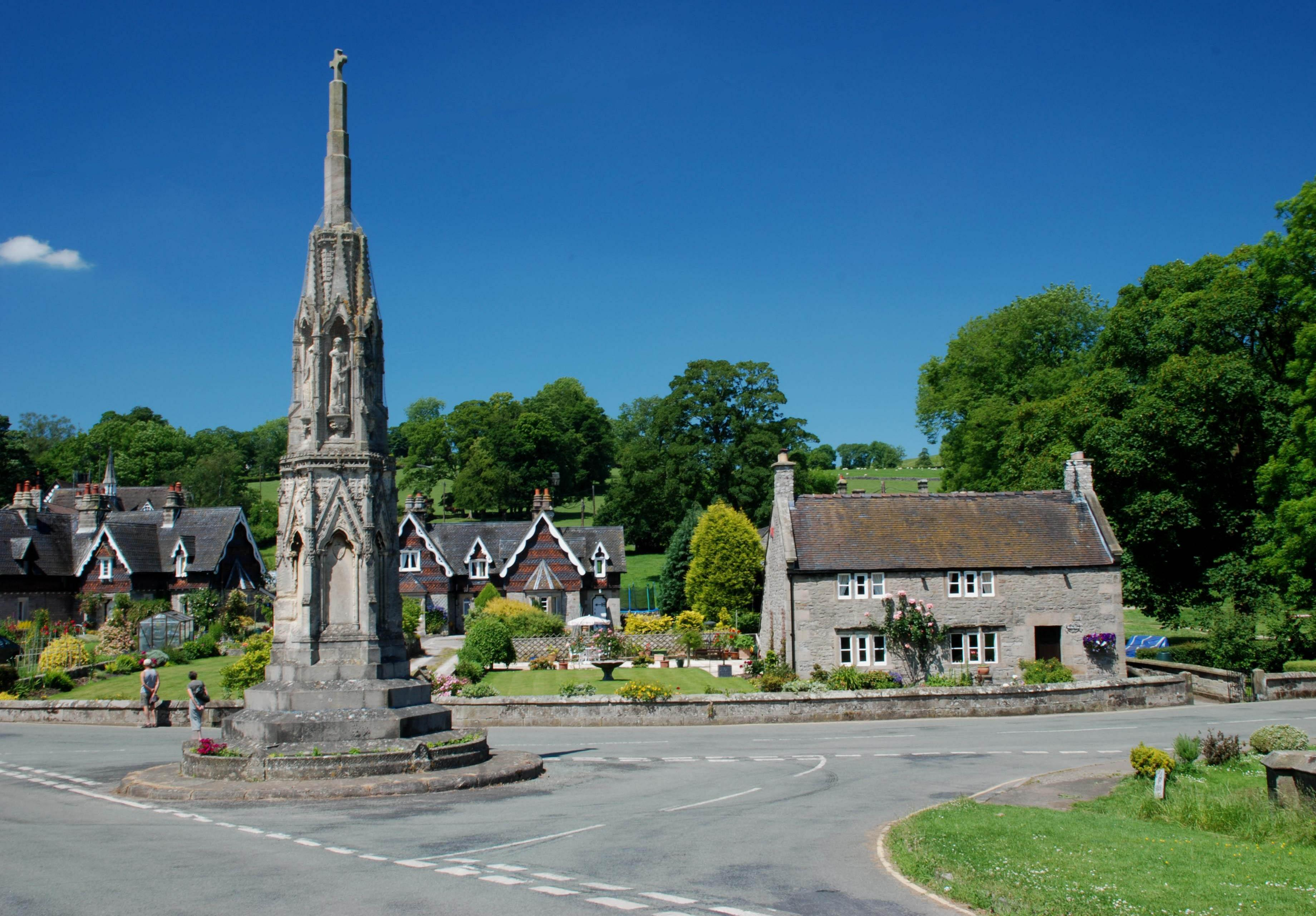
Ilam Cross, 1840

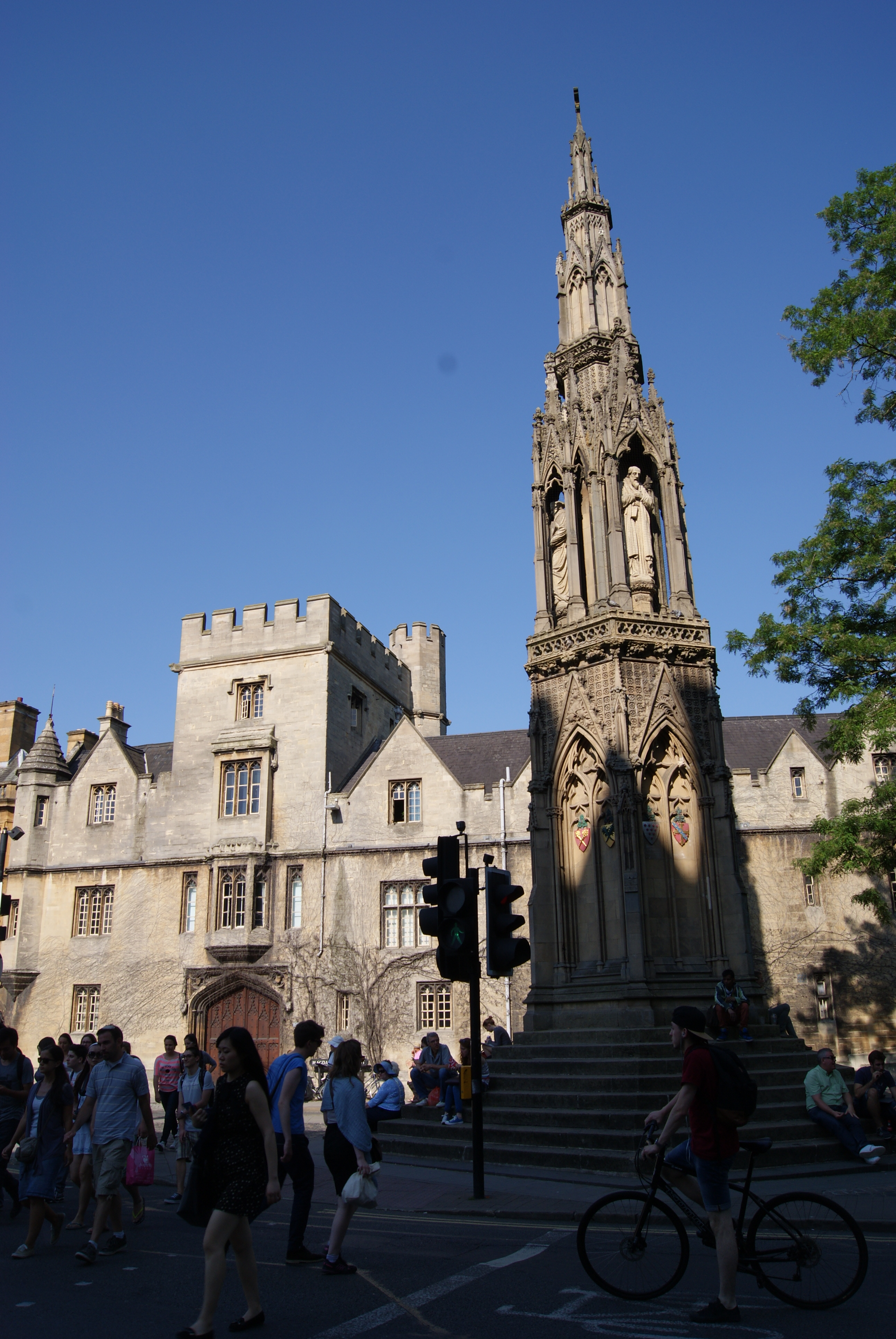
Martyrs' Memorial, Oxford, 1841

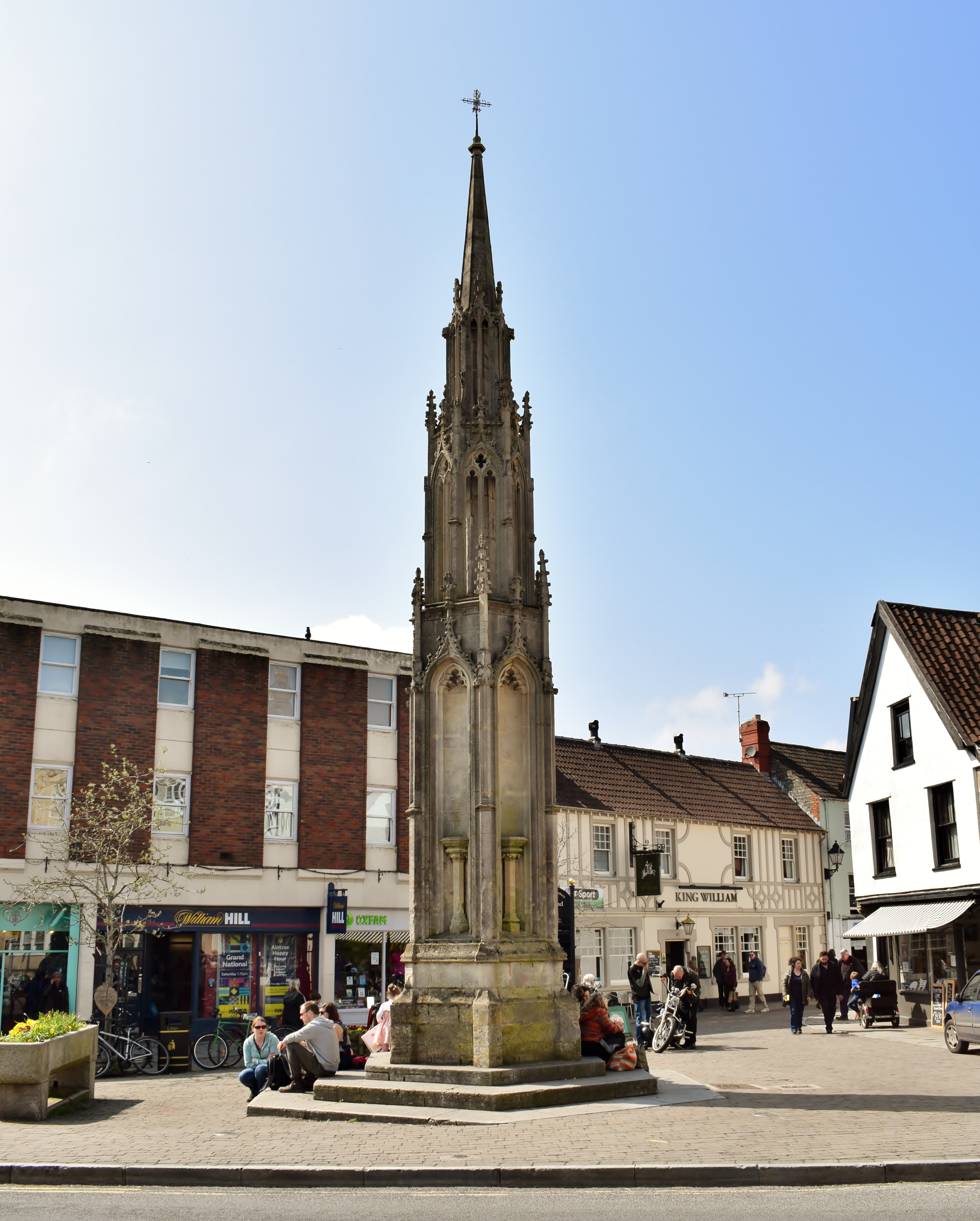
Glastonbury Market Cross, 1846

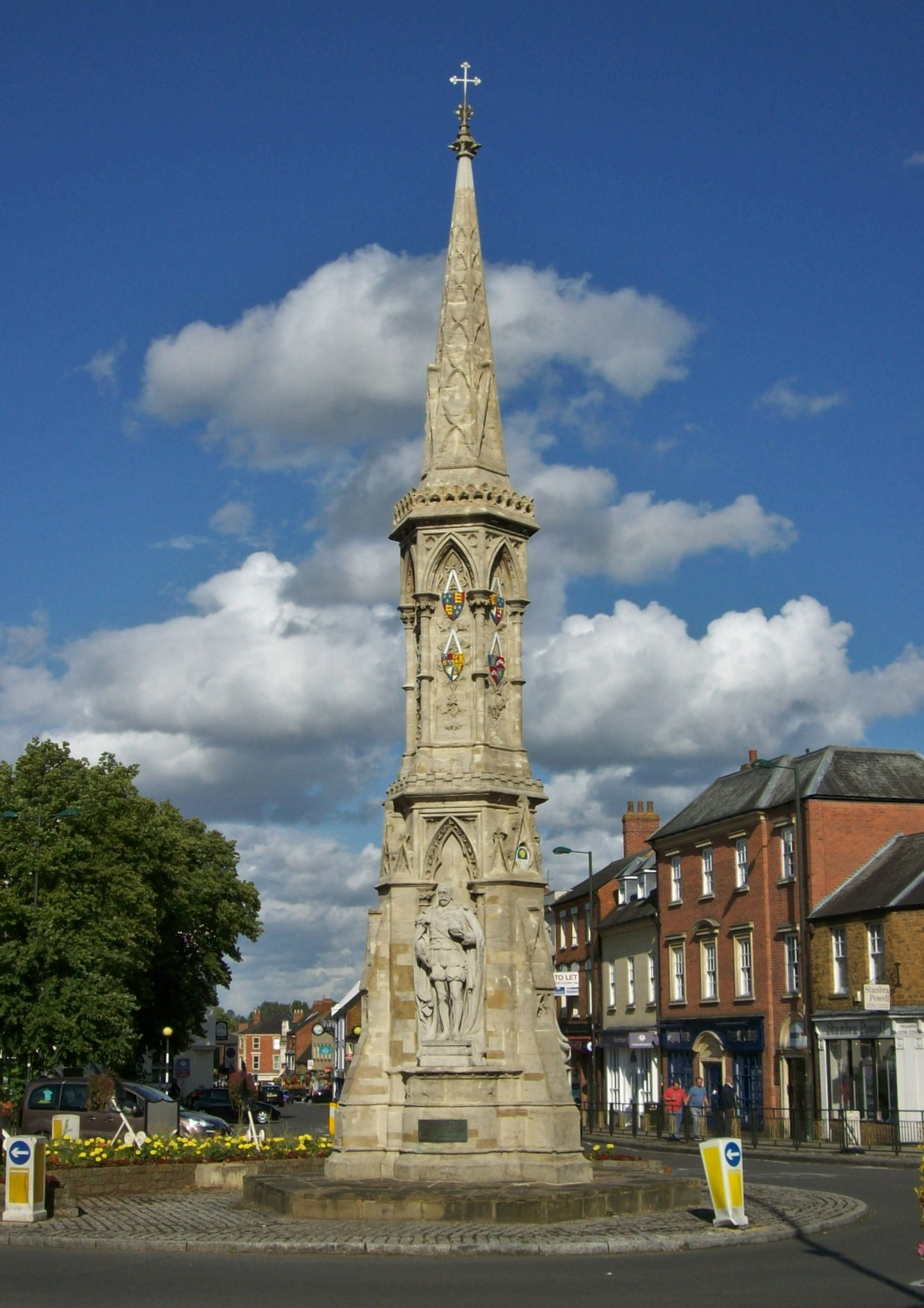
Banbury Cross, 1859

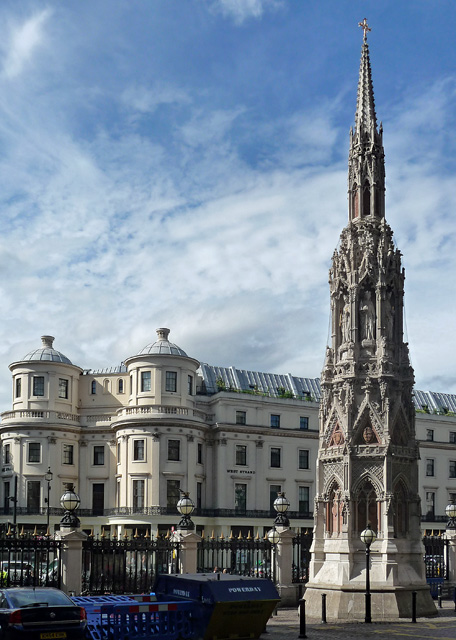
Charing Cross, London, 1865

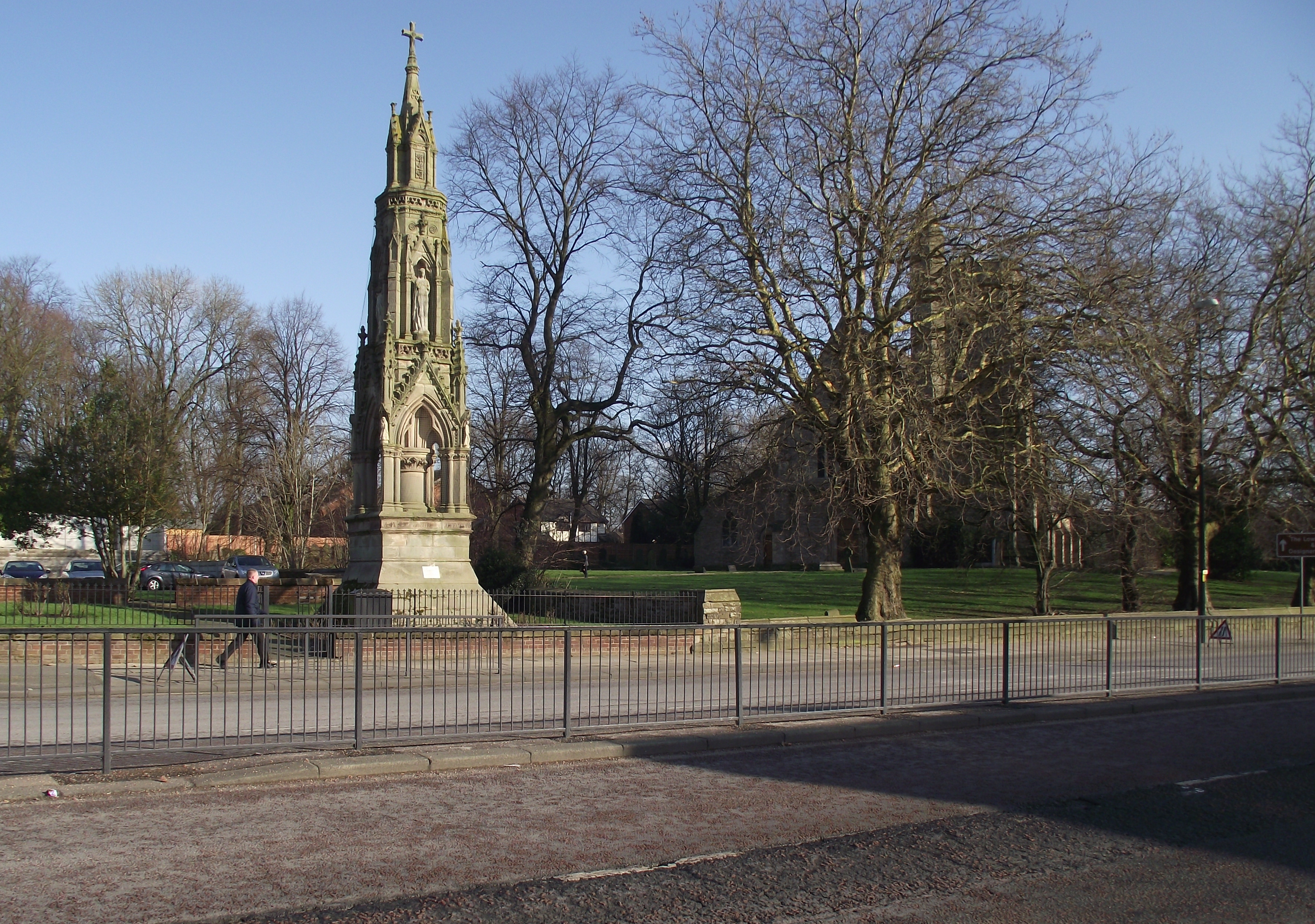
Ellesmere Memorial, Walkden, 1868

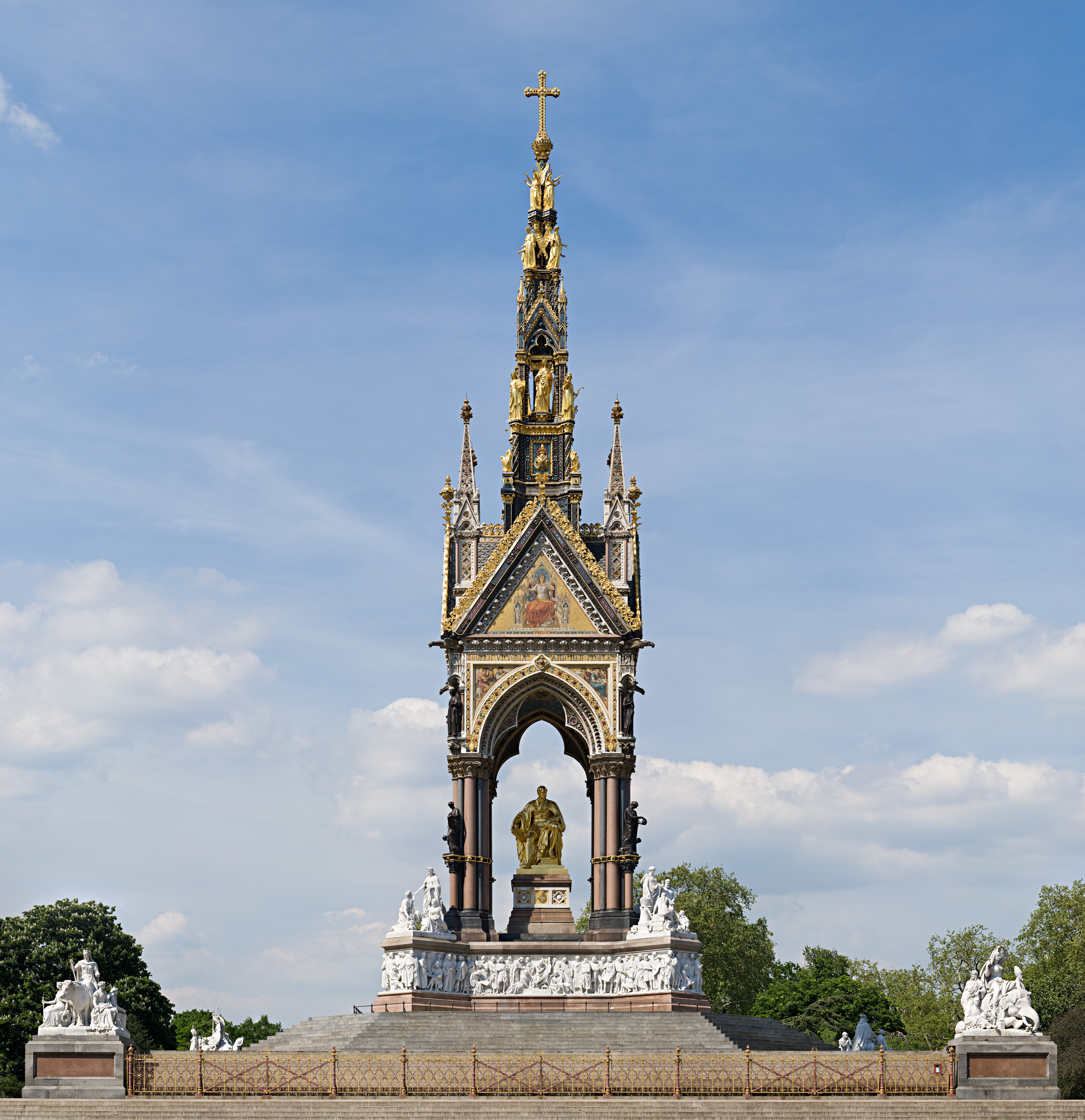
Albert Memorial, London, 1872

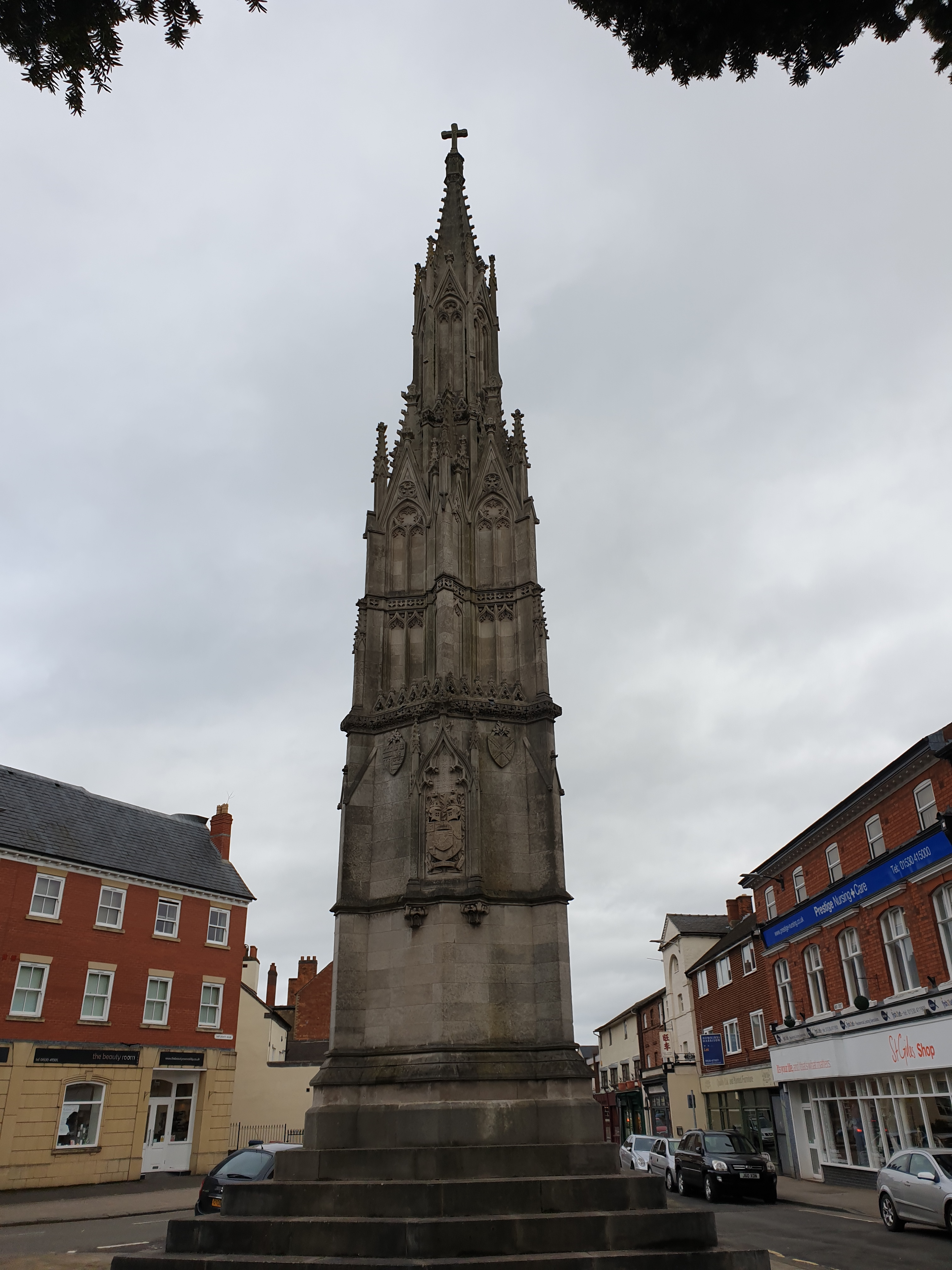
Loudoun Memorial, Ashby-de-la-Zouch, 1879

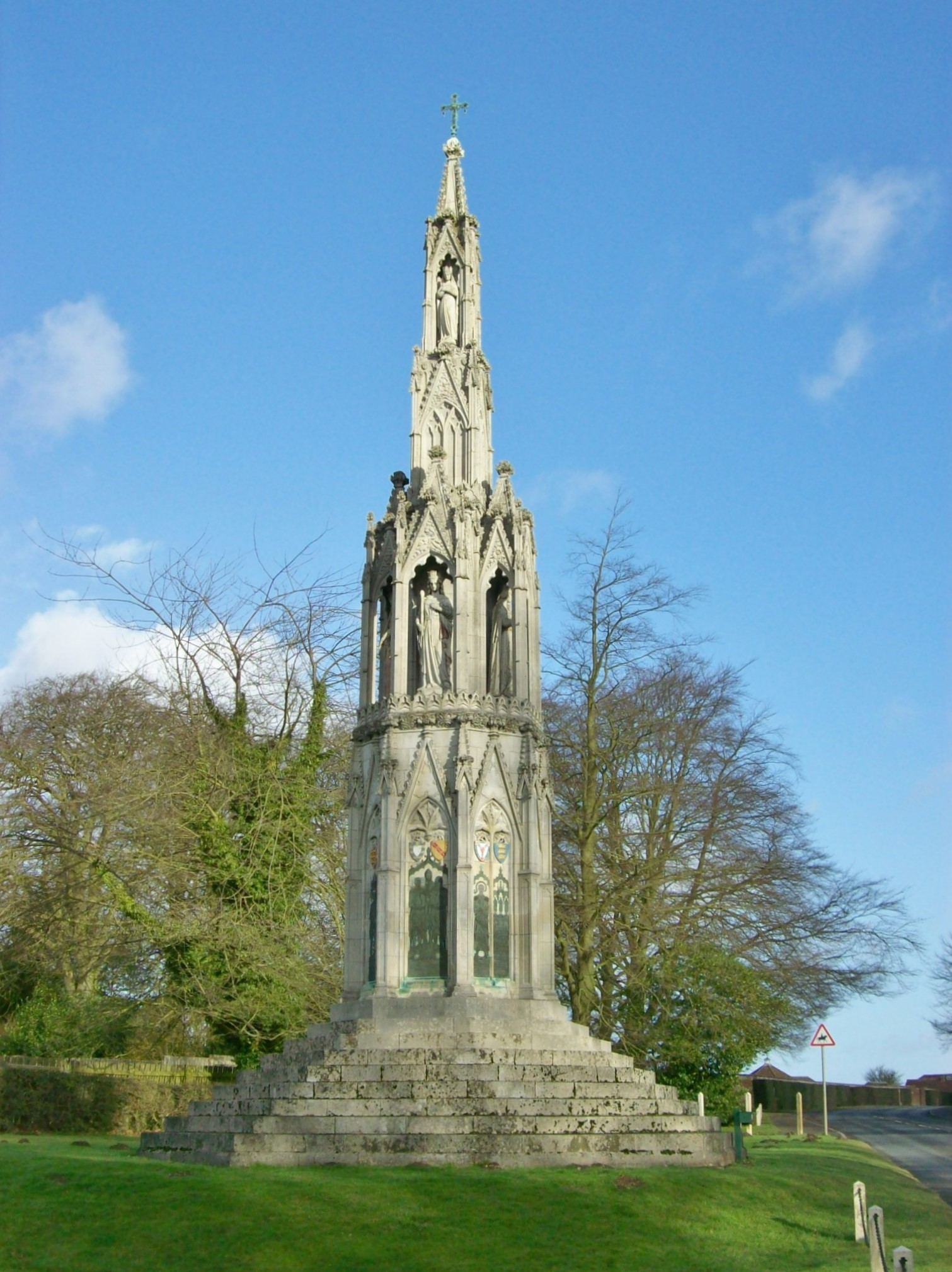
Sledmere Cross, 1896

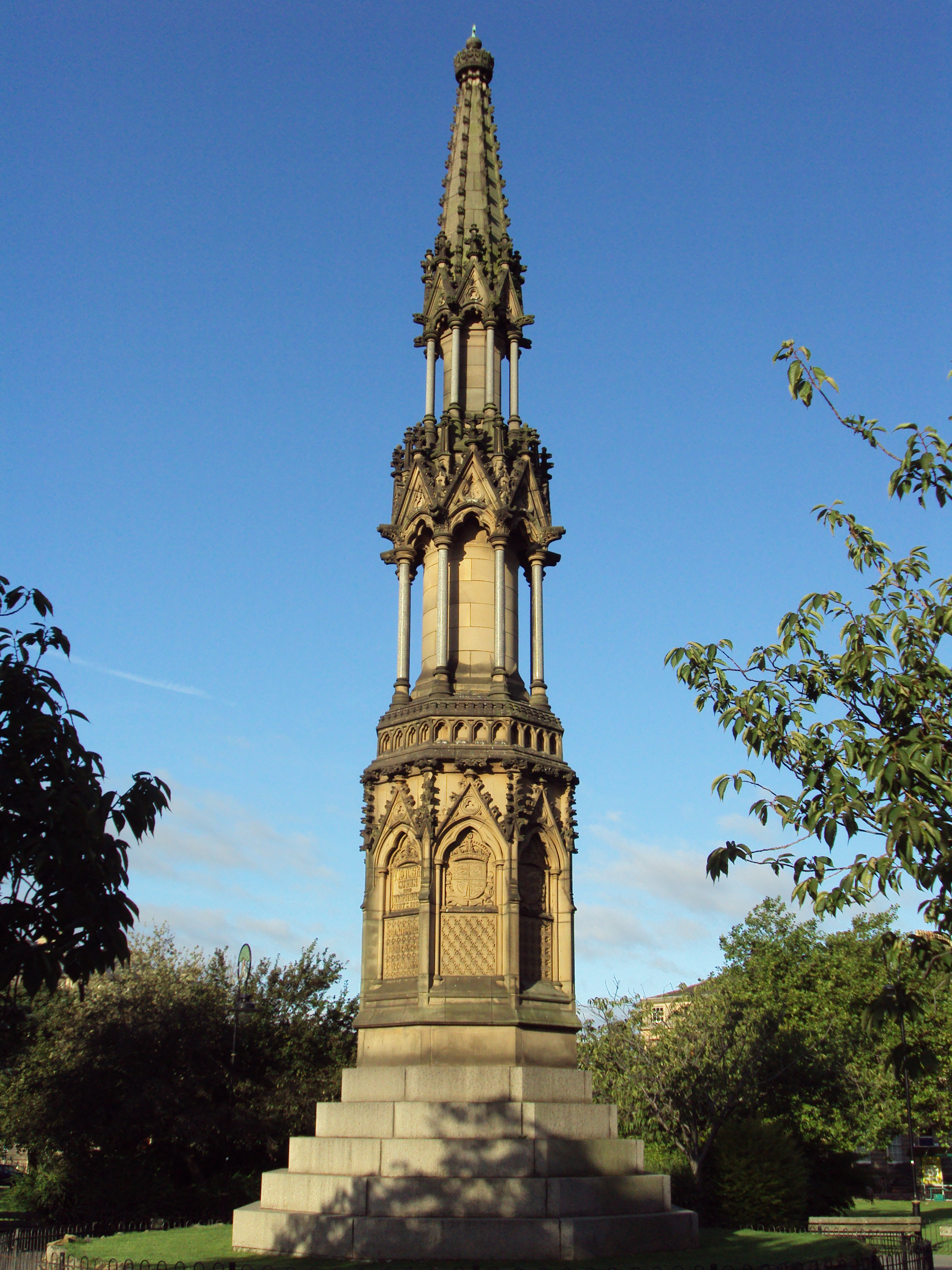
Queen Victoria Monument, Birkenhead, 1905

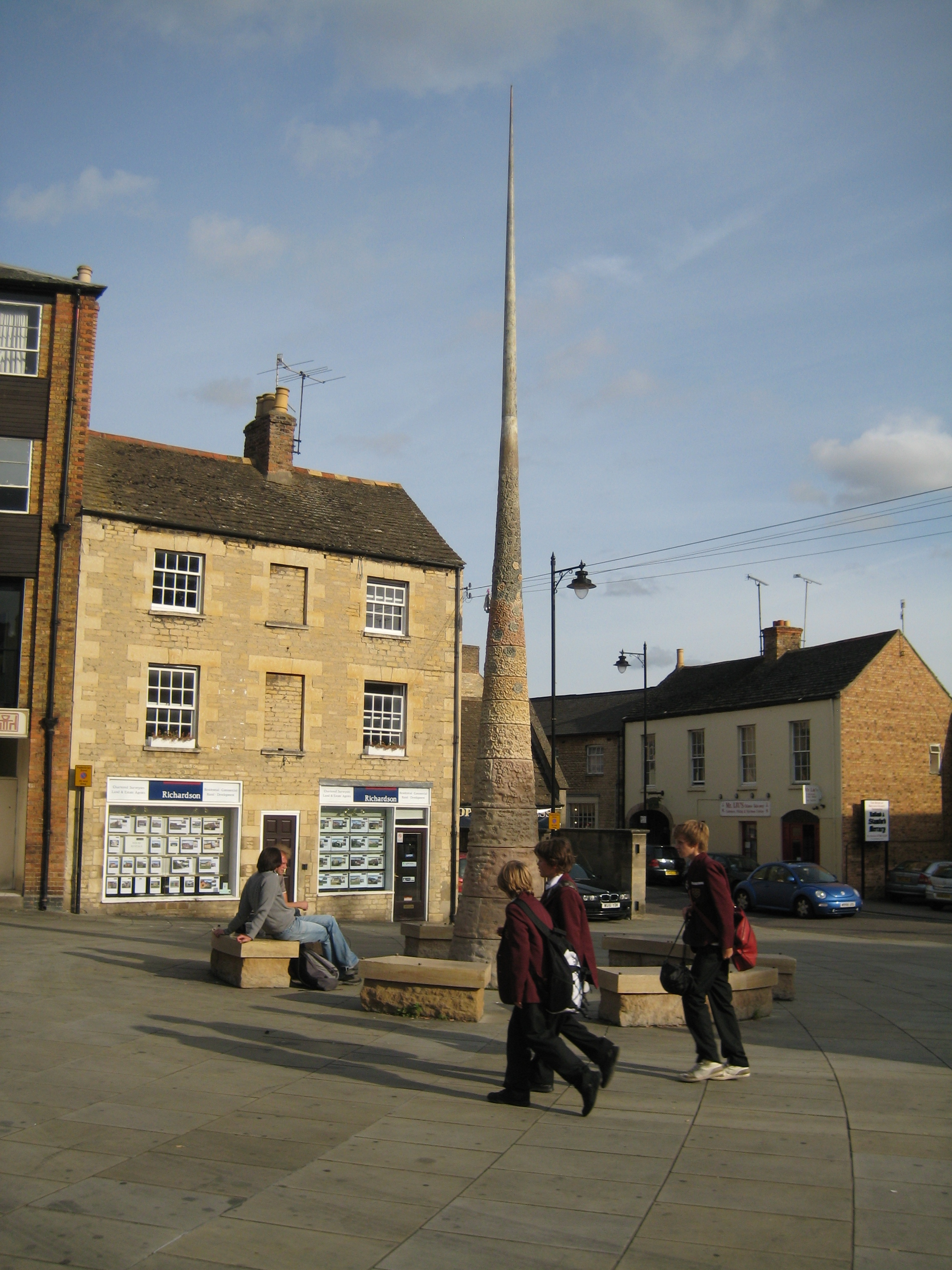
The modern sculpture to Eleanor in Stamford, 2009

== Sources ==
- Alexander, Jonathan; Binski, Paul, eds. (1987). "The Eleanor crosses". Age of Chivalry: art in Plantagenet England, 1200–1400. London: Royal Academy of Arts. pp. 361–66. ISBN 9780297791904. OL 46862874M.
- Binski, Paul (1996). Medieval Death: Ritual and Representation. London: British Museum Press.
- Botfield, Beriah; Turner, T. Hudson, eds. (1841). "Liberationes factis per executores Dominae Alianorae consortis Edwardi Regis Angliae Primi". Manners and Household Expenses of England in the Thirteenth and Fifteenth Centuries. London: Roxburghe Club. pp. lvii–lxxxiv, 93–145. [An edition of the account rolls documenting payments for the construction of the crosses and monuments, 1291–94]
- Cockerill, Sara (2014). Eleanor of Castile: the shadow queen. Stroud: Amberley. pp. 342–59. ISBN 9781445635897.
- Colvin, H. M. (1963). "Royal tombs and monuments, 1066–1485". In Colvin, H. M. (ed.). The History of the King's Works. Vol. 1. London: HMSO. pp. 477–90 (479–85).
- Davies, Joshua (2018). "Queen Eleanor and her crosses: Trauma and memory, medieval and modern". Visions and ruins. Manchester: Manchester University Press. doi:10.7765/9781526125941.00007. ISBN 9781526125934.
- Evans, Joan (1949). "A prototype of the Eleanor crosses". Burlington Magazine. 91: 96–97.
- Galloway, James (1914). Historical Sketches of Old Charing: The Hospital and Chapel of Saint Mary Roncevall: Eleanor of Castile, Queen of England, and the Monuments Erected in her Memory. London: John Bale, Sons & Danielsson. pp. 51–82.
- Gentleman, David (1979). A Cross for Queen Eleanor: the story of the building of the mediaeval Charing Cross, the subject of the decorations of the Northern Line platforms of the new Charing Cross Underground Station. London: London Transport. ISBN 0-85329-101-2.
- Griffin, Eric (2015). "Copying "the Anti-Spaniard": Post-Armada Hispanophobia and English Renaissance Drama". In Fuchs, Barbara; Weissbourd, Emily (eds.). Representing Imperial Rivalry in the Early Modern Mediterranean. University of Toronto Press. ISBN 9781442649026. JSTOR 10.3138/j.ctt14bth82. OL 29255494M.
- Griffin, Eric J. (2009). English Renaissance Drama and the Specter of Spain: Ethnopoetics and Empire. University of Pennsylvania Press. ISBN 9780812241709. JSTOR j.ctt3fh8z6. OL 23081992M.
- Hastings, Maurice (1955). St Stephen's Chapel and its Place in the Development of Perpendicular Style in England. Cambridge: Cambridge University Press. pp. 20–27.
- Hillaby, Joe (1994). "The ritual-child-murder accusation: its dissemination and Harold of Gloucester". Jewish Historical Studies. 34: 69–109. JSTOR 29779954.
- Hillaby, Joe; Hillaby, Caroline (2013). The Palgrave Dictionary of Medieval Anglo-Jewish History. Basingstoke: Palgrave Macmillan. ISBN 978-0-23027-816-5.
- Hunter, Joseph (1842). "On the death of Eleanor of Castile, consort of King Edward the First, and the honours paid to her memory". Archaeologia. 29: 167–91. doi:10.1017/S0261340900001983.
- Liversidge, M. J. H. (1989). "Alexander of Abingdon". In Liversidge, W. J. H.; Liversidge, M. J. H. (eds.). Abingdon Essays: Studies in Local History. Abingdon. pp. 89–111.
- Lovell, Walter (1892). "Queen Eleanor's Crosses" (PDF). Archaeological Journal. 49: 17–43. doi:10.1080/00665983.1892.10852513.
- Morris, Marc (2009). A Great and Terrible King: Edward I and the Forging of Britain. Windmill Books. ISBN 978-0-09-948175-1.
- Parsons, David, ed. (1991). Eleanor of Castile 1290–1990: essays to commemorate the 700th anniversary of her death. Stamford: Paul Watkins. ISBN 1871615984.
- Parsons, John Carmi (1995). Eleanor of Castile: queen and society in thirteenth-century England. Basingstoke: Macmillan. ISBN 0333619706.
- Powrie, Jean (1990). Eleanor of Castile. Studley: Brewin Books. ISBN 0947731792.
- Stacey, Robert (2001). "Anti-Semitism and the Medieval English State". In Maddicott, J. R.; Pallister, D. M. (eds.). The Medieval State: Essays Presented to James Campbell. London: The Hambledon Press. pp. 163–77.
- David Stocker (1986). "The Shrine of Little St Hugh". Medieval Art and Architecture at Lincoln Cathedral. British Archaeological Association. pp. 109–117. ISBN 978-0-907307-14-3.
- Warrington, Decca (2018). The Eleanor Crosses: the story of King Edward I's lost queen and her architectural legacy. Oxford: Signal Books. ISBN 978-1-909930-65-0.
