= Queen Victoria Monument, Birkenhead =

Monument dedicated to Queen Victoria in Hamilton Square, Birkenhead, Wirral, England

Coordinates: 53.39358°N 3.01603°W

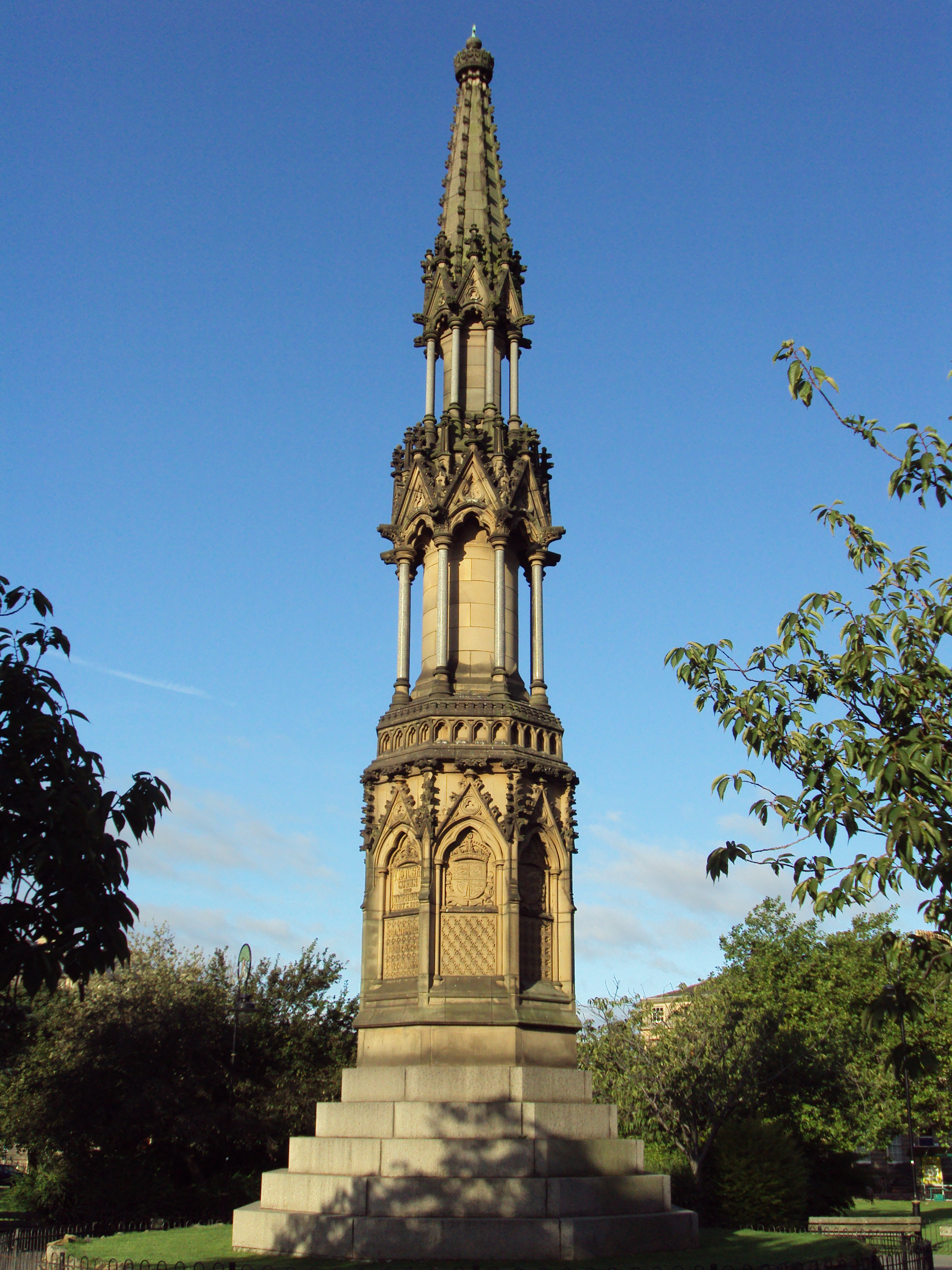
Queen Victoria Monument in Birkenhead

The Queen Victoria Monument stands in the centre of Hamilton Square, Birkenhead, Wirral, Merseyside, England. It is in the form of an Eleanor cross. The memorial was designed by Edmund Kirby, and was unveiled in 1905. It is recorded in the National Heritage List for England as a designated Grade II listed building.

== History ==
Following the death of Queen Victoria in 1901, a Victoria Memorial Committee was established in Birkenhead to make arrangements for a memorial to the queen. An open space was created in the centre of Hamilton Square in 1903 by Birkenhead Town Council. The committee then discussed the form of the memorial to stand in its centre. It had been hoped to have a monument in bronze, but the amount of money raised was inadequate to provide this, and it was decided that the monument should be in the form of an Eleanor cross.

Eleanor crosses were erected by King Edward I in the late 13th century to commemorate the life of his wife, Eleanor of Castile, and were erected on the sites where her coffin rested. The typical design of an Eleanor cross was that of a polygonal base on steps, surmounted by stages of reducing size. The lowest stage was solid, and the upper stages were open. The committee considered that this would be appropriate as a it would follow the design of a memorial to an admired queen. One of the members of the committee was the architect Edmund Kirby, who agreed to design the memorial free of charge. The identity of the sculptor is not recorded. Kirby had previously worked with Richard Boulton and Sons of Cheltenham, and it is possible that this was the responsible company. The monument was unveiled, before it was finished, by Charles Gatehouse, a local politician and a member of the committee, on 26 October 1905. It cost £1,400.

== Description ==
The monument is constructed in sandstone from Darley Dale. The steps on which it stands, and the columns in the second and third stages are in granite from Newry. The monument stands about 23 metres (75 ft) high. It is in Gothic style. Each stage of the monument is octagonal. It stands on five steps, and consists of four stages, each stage being narrower than the stage below. The lowest stage is solid, and each side has a gabled canopy. In the front is an inscription reading as follows.

VICTORIA
QUEEN
AND
EMPRESS
1837–1901
SHE WROUGHT
HER PEOPLE
LASTING GOOD (Note: The inscription includes the last line of the fourth stanza of To the Queen, a poem by Tennyson.)

Each of the other sides contains a coat of arms in relief, and its associated motto. In clockwise order from the front these are the arms and mottoes of Birkenhead, Cheshire, Wales, Ireland, Scotland, England, and the Royal arms. The middle two stages of the monument are open, with arcades and granite columns, and the top stage consists of a crocketed spire surmounted by a crown finial.

== Appraisal ==
The memorial was designated a Grade II listed building on 28 March 1974. Grade II is the lowest of the three grades of listing and is applied to "buildings of national importance and special interest".

== See also ==
- Listed buildings in Birkenhead

== Notes and references ==
Notes

Citations

Sources

- Morris, Edward; Roberts, Emma (2012), Public Sculpture of Cheshire and Merseyside (excluding Liverpool), Public Sculpture of Britain, vol. 15, Liverpool: Liverpool University Press, ISBN 978-1-84631-492-6
- Historic England, "Monument to Queen Victoria (1201581)", National Heritage List for England
- Historic England, Listed Buildings
- National Recording Project, Queen Victoria Monument, archived from the original on 16 January 2014
