= Queen Eleanor Memorial Cross =

Coordinates: 51.5084°N 0.1253°W

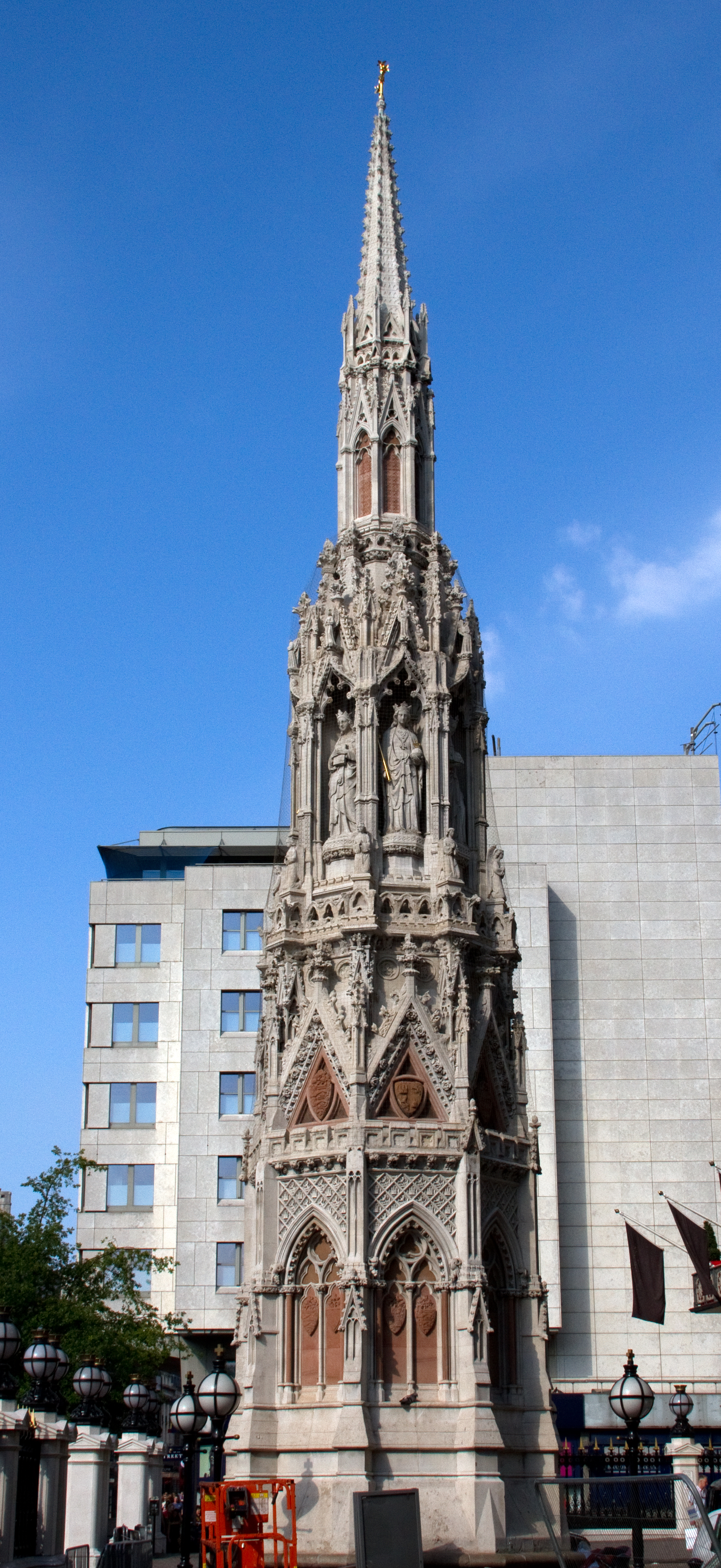
- The cross in 2011
- Interactive map of Queen Eleanor Memorial Cross
- Location: Charing Cross railway station London, WC2

History
- Built: 1864–1865

Site notes
- Architect: Edward Middleton Barry

Listed Building – Grade II*
- Designated: 5 February 1970
- Reference no.: 1236708

The Queen Eleanor Memorial Cross is a memorial to Eleanor of Castile erected in the forecourt of Charing Cross railway station, London, in 1864–1865. It is a fanciful reconstruction of the medieval Eleanor cross at Charing, one of twelve memorial crosses erected by Edward I of England in memory of his first wife. The Victorian monument was designed by Edward Middleton Barry, also the architect of the railway station, and includes multiple statues of Queen Eleanor by the sculptor Thomas Earp. It is located 200 metres (220 yd) northeast of the original site of the Charing Cross (destroyed in 1647), which is now occupied by Hubert Le Sueur's equestrian statue of Charles I, installed in 1675; both are along the Strand roadway.

Barry based the memorial on the three surviving drawings of the Charing Cross, in the Bodleian Library, the British Museum and the collection of the Royal Society of Antiquaries. However, due to the fragmentary nature of this evidence, he also drew from a wider range of sources including the other surviving Eleanor crosses and Queen Eleanor's tomb at Westminster Abbey. In this search for precedents Barry was assisted by his fellow architect Arthur Ashpitel. The coats of arms of England, León, Castile and Ponthieu appear on the monument.
