= Glastonbury Market Cross =

Glastonbury Cross
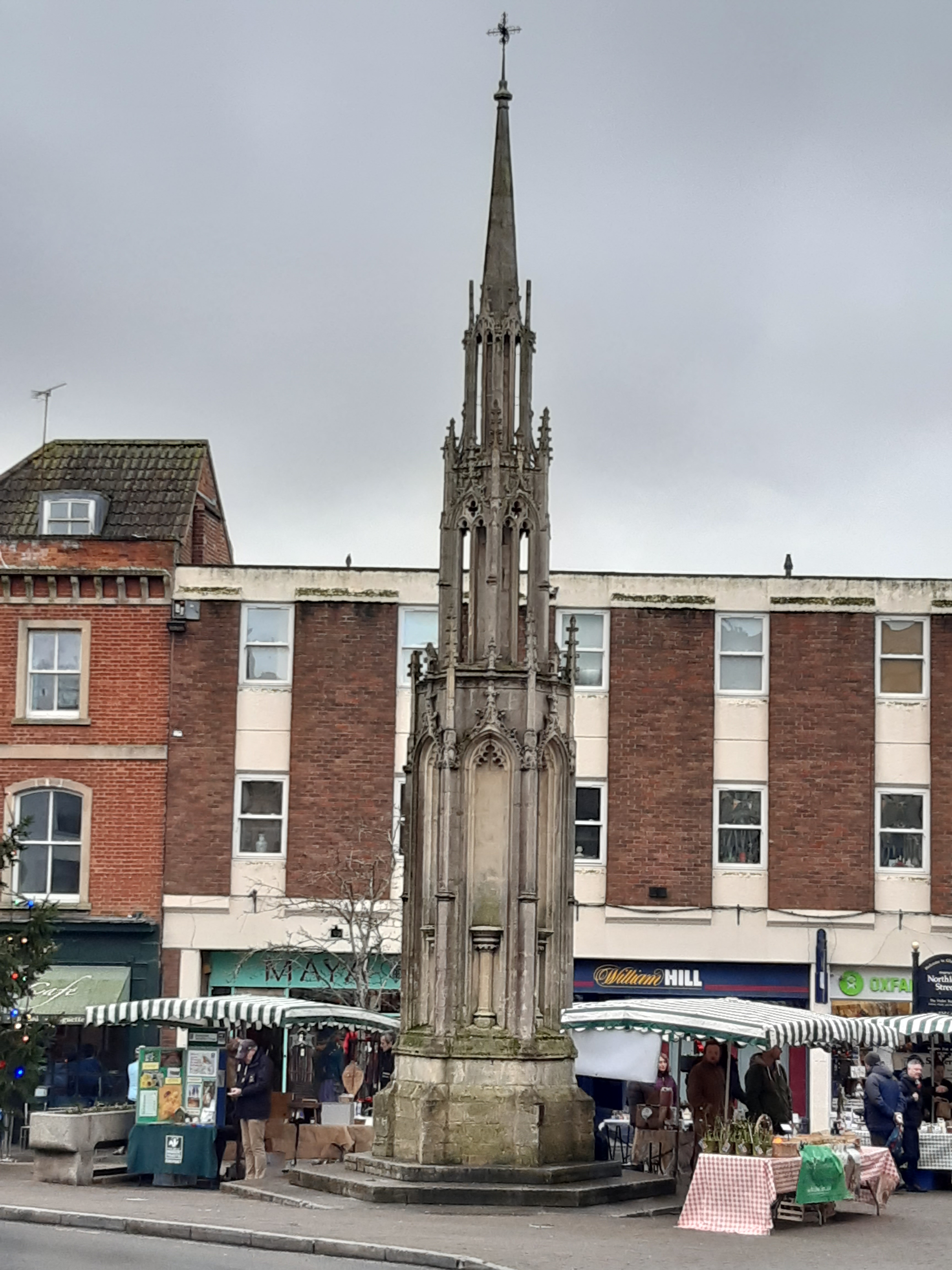
- The Market Cross

- Location within Somerset
- 51.1473°N 2.7179°W
- Location: Glastonbury, Somerset, England

History
- Built: 1856

Site notes
- Architect: Benjamin Ferrey

Listed Building – Grade II
- Official name: Market Cross
- Designated: 21 June 1950
- Reference no.: 1057910

Glastonbury Market Cross is a market cross in Glastonbury, Somerset, England. Erected in 1846, it was designed by the English architect Benjamin Ferrey and has been a Grade II listed structure since 1950.

== History ==
Glastonbury's cross replaced an earlier structure of early 16th century origin, described as having been "of some antiquity", octagonal with clustered pillars, a central column and a roof. It fell into a state of disrepair and was demolished around 1806. Later in the 19th century, T. Porch, the proprietor of Glastonbury Abbey, proposed that a new market cross be erected on the same site. It was erected in 1846 under the supervision of Ferrey and has most recently undergone restoration in 2005.

== Design ==
Glastonbury Cross is built of Bath stone in a Perpendicular Gothic style and has a height of 38 feet. It has an octagonal base supporting a spirelet, which is embellished with ornamental work and tracery.

Reporting on the cross in 1846, The Gentleman's Magazine described it as an "elegant structure" and a "great ornament to the town" with a "noble and imposing appearance". They added: "It is of a mixed style of architecture, conceived upon the outline of the famous conduit at Rouen, and from the elegant crosses of Geddington and Waltham".
