= Alexander of Abingdon =

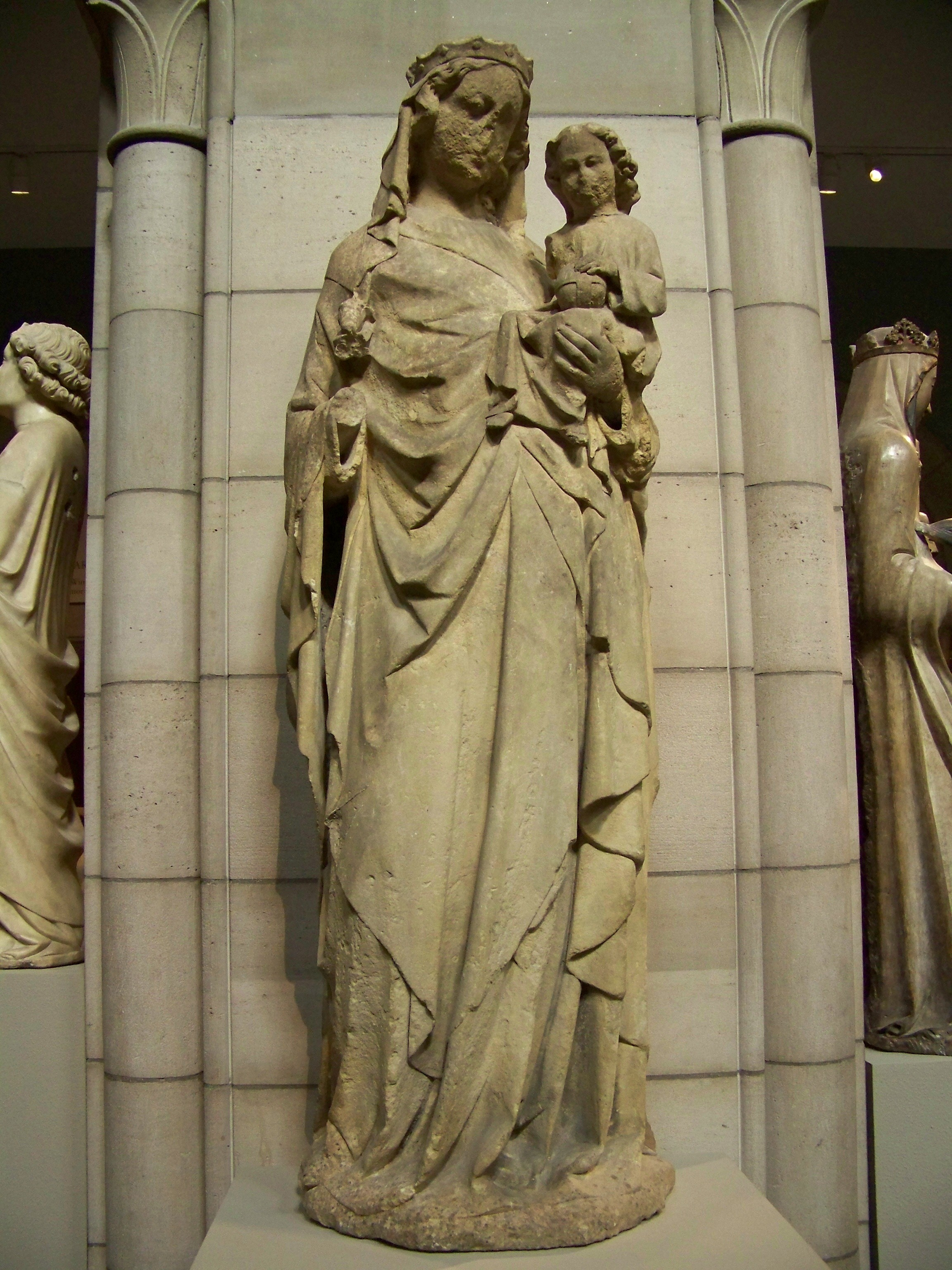
The Virgin and Child, attributed to Alexander of Abingdon, in the Metropolitan Museum, New York.

Alexander of Abingdon, also known as Alexander Imaginator or Alexander le Imagineur (i.e. "the image-maker"), was one of the leading sculptors of England around 1300.

== Life ==
Alexander of Abingdon is assumed to have been from Abingdon, Berkshire, which was something of a centre of stonecutting and masonry. By 1291 he was active in London, where he probably lived for most of his life. In the accounts of the executors of the estate of Queen Eleanor of Castile, Alexander is described as a maker of images ("le ymagour"). It seems that this term indicated a maker of statues of human figures carved in the round, rather than a mason working on the general architectural ornament.

From 1291 to 1294, he was employed on carving the marble tomb-chest for the bronze effigy of Queen Eleanor of Castile in Lincoln Cathedral. Alexander of Abingdon also supplied wax models for three small images cast by William of Suffolk for Eleanor's heart in the Blackfriars' church in London. All of these works are now lost. He is last documented in 1316–17, when he was associated with the royal master mason, Michael of Canterbury. It is likely that Alexander and Michael of Canterbury also worked together at Ely Cathedral on the tomb of Bishop William of Louth (died 1298), Alexander again being responsible for the effigy.

== Work ==
Alexander of Abingdon's three authenticated sculptures are now on loan to the Victoria and Albert Museum in London. These figures represent Queen Eleanor of Castile and they were carved for the Waltham Cross, one of the twelve monumental "Eleanor crosses" commissioned by her husband, King Edward I, after the Queen's death in Harby, Nottinghamshire in 1290. These memorials marked the places where Eleanor's body rested for the night on the funerary route to Westminster. On the basis of stylistic similarities, the sculpture of a standing Virgin and Child, acquired by the New York Metropolitan Museum of Art in 2003, is also attributed to Alexander of Abingdon. The sculptor's style is characterised by a subtle treatment of draperies, which are both heavy and intricate.

There are stylistic affinities between Alexander of Abingdon's figures and the paintings and illuminations in the Westminster style. Abingdon's work has been associated particularly with that of the painter and illuminator, Master Walter of Durham, who was active in the Palace of Westminster and in the Westminster Abbey and who is also known to have executed work on Queen Eleanor's tomb around 1292. Master Walter might have also done some work for Abingdon Abbey. The affinity between Alexander of Abingdon's sculptures and contemporary illuminations assist in locating him within the circle of courtly art.
