= Waltham, Minnesota =

City in Minnesota, United States

- City
- Location in Mower County and the state of Minnesota
- Coordinates: 43°49′10″N 92°52′32″W
- Country: United States
- State: Minnesota
- County: Mower

Area
  - Total: 0.48 sq mi (1.24 km^{2})
  - Land: 0.48 sq mi (1.24 km^{2})
  - Water: 0 sq mi (0.00 km^{2})
- Elevation: 1,319 ft (402 m)

Population (2020)
  - Total: 164
  - Density: 343.1/sq mi (132.48/km^{2})
- Time zone: UTC-6 (Central (CST))
  - Summer (DST): UTC-5 (CDT)
- ZIP code: 55982
- Area code: 507
- FIPS code: 27-67918
- GNIS feature ID: 2397185

Waltham is a city in Mower County, Minnesota, United States. The population was 164 at the 2020 census.

== History ==
Waltham was platted in 1885 and named after Waltham, Massachusetts.

== Geography ==
The community is in northwestern Mower County, surrounded by Waltham and independent of it. Minnesota State Highway 56 runs along the eastern border of the city, leading north 5 miles (8 km) to Hayfield and south the same distance to Brownsdale. Austin, the Mower county seat, is 15 miles (24 km) to the southwest via MN 56 and Interstate 90.

According to the U.S. Census Bureau, Waltham has a total area of 0.48 square miles (1.24 km^{2}), all land. It drains westward toward the Cedar River, a south-flowing tributary of the Iowa River.

== Demographics ==
Historical population
Census	Pop.	Note	%±
1900	150		—
1910	170		13.3%
1920	180		5.9%
1930	190		5.6%
1940	172		−9.5%
1950	212		23.3%
1960	207		−2.4%
1970	189		−8.7%
1980	176		−6.9%
1990	170		−3.4%
2000	196		15.3%
2010	151		−23.0%
2020	164		8.6%
U.S. Decennial Census

=== 2010 census ===
As of the census of 2010, there were 151 people, 67 households, and 40 families living in the city. The population density was 328.3 inhabitants per square mile (126.8/km^{2}). There were 73 housing units at an average density of 158.7 per square mile (61.3/km^{2}). The racial makeup of the city was 97.4% White, 0.7% Asian, and 2.0% from two or more races. Hispanic or Latino of any race were 2.0% of the population.

There were 67 households, of which 23.9% had children under the age of 18 living with them, 49.3% were married couples living together, 4.5% had a female householder with no husband present, 6.0% had a male householder with no wife present, and 40.3% were non-families. 31.3% of all households were made up of individuals, and 6% had someone living alone who was 65 years of age or older. The average household size was 2.25 and the average family size was 2.90.

The median age in the city was 41.2 years. 19.9% of residents were under the age of 18; 7.1% were between the ages of 18 and 24; 28.5% were from 25 to 44; 33.1% were from 45 to 64; and 11.3% were 65 years of age or older. The gender makeup of the city was 54.3% male and 45.7% female.

=== 2000 census ===
As of the census of 2000, there were 196 people, 68 households, and 52 families living in the city. The population density was 425.0 inhabitants per square mile (164.1/km^{2}). There were 72 housing units at an average density of 156.1 per square mile (60.3/km^{2}). The racial makeup of the city was 96.43% White, 3.57% from other races. Hispanic or Latino of any race were 6.63% of the population.

There were 68 households, out of which 39.7% had children under the age of 18 living with them, 61.8% were married couples living together, 8.8% had a female householder with no husband present, and 23.5% were non-families. 20.6% of all households were made up of individuals, and 8.8% had someone living alone who was 65 years of age or older. The average household size was 2.88 and the average family size was 3.31.

In the city, the population was spread out, with 32.1% under the age of 18, 9.7% from 18 to 24, 27.6% from 25 to 44, 16.3% from 45 to 64, and 14.3% who were 65 years of age or older. The median age was 35 years. For every 100 females, there were 98.0 males. For every 100 females age 18 and over, there were 98.5 males.

The median income for a household in the city was $35,000, and the median income for a family was $35,625. Males had a median income of $27,500 versus $21,042 for females. The per capita income for the city was $26,047. About 4.1% of families and 5.2% of the population were below the poverty line, including 8.3% of those under the age of eighteen and none of those 65 or over.
