= Waltham Cross =

Town in Hertfordshire, England

Coordinates: 51.686°N 0.0331°W

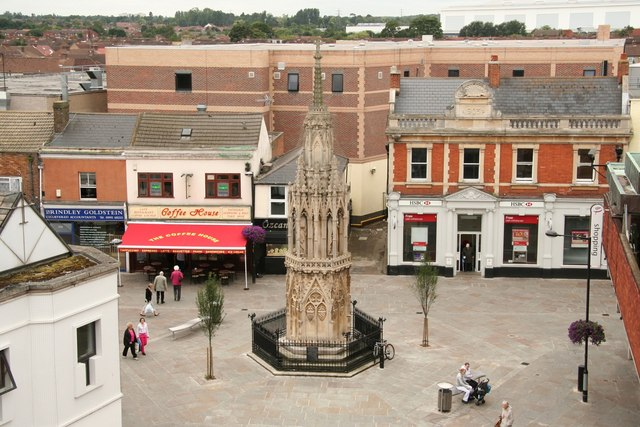
- The Eleanor Cross

- Location within Hertfordshire
- Population: 8,577 (2021 census, Waltham Cross ward)
- OS grid reference: TL360003
  - London: 12 mi (19 km) SSW
- District: Broxbourne
- Shire county: Hertfordshire
- Region: East
- Country: England
- Sovereign state: United Kingdom
- Post town: WALTHAM CROSS
- Postcode district: EN8
- Dialling code: 01992
- Police: Hertfordshire
- Fire: Hertfordshire
- Ambulance: East of England
- UK Parliament: Broxbourne

Waltham Cross is a town in the Borough of Broxbourne, Hertfordshire, England, located 12 miles (19 km) north of central London. In the south-eastern corner of Hertfordshire, it borders Cheshunt to the north, Waltham Abbey to the east, and Enfield to the south.

Historically part of the ancient parish of Cheshunt in the Hertford hundred of Hertfordshire, the town once formed its southern part. Waltham Cross formed a separate ecclesiastical parish in 1855, whilst remaining part of the Cheshunt civil parish. The parish of Cheshunt was granted urban district status in 1894, and merged with that of Hoddesdon to form the Borough of Broxbourne in 1974.

The town has a modest commercial centre, with a pedestrianised High Street and an indoor shopping centre. The Waltham Cross post town stretches to the neighbouring town of Cheshunt and a small part of Enfield. It is named after the Eleanor cross which stands in its centre, one of twelve constructed on the orders of King Edward I following the death of his wife Eleanor of Castile in 1290. Only three of the original crosses remain intact, including the Waltham cross and two more in the Northamptonshire villages of Geddington and Hardingstone.

== Geography ==
The town falls within Hertfordshire's Borough of Broxbourne, the metropolitan area of London, and the Greater London Urban Area, with Waltham Abbey to the east, Cheshunt to the north, and Enfield to the south. The M25 motorway runs immediately south of the town, bordering the area of Freezywater. The Waltham Cross post town includes the neighbouring town of Cheshunt and some northern sections of Enfield, including the Holmesdale Estate. Waltham Cross occupies a south-eastern far corner of Hertfordshire so bordering Essex, and its former parent Urban District was dissolved into its present local government unit, the Borough of Broxbourne, in 1974.

== History ==
From Roman times, the village of Walthame had been situated next to the River Lea, a tributary of the River Thames, in the ancient parish of Cheshunt in the Hertford hundred of Hertfordshire., and since the building of its Eleanor Cross in the 1290s, was known as the Walthame Cross.

The southern part of Cheshunt was increasingly considered to be part of Waltham Cross, which was formed into a separate ecclesiastical parish in 1855, with its church of the Holy Trinity (since renamed Christ Church) built in 1832, designed by the architect Edward Blore. The road, here long called the High Street, had 'Spital Houses' (Hospitalry Houses) near the county boundary, originally built in 1625 but rebuilt in 1908. In the early 20th century, all along the 2 1/4 miles (3.6 km) of the road which Cheshunt and Waltham Cross covered, there were numerous inns and taverns, one or two of which, such as the Four Swans Inn, plied for trade until at least that date from the 17th century, but most of them dated from the 18th century and later.

The town takes its name from the Eleanor Cross which stands in its centre.

Waltham Cross formed part of Cheshunt Urban District from 1894 to 1974. A suburb of London, the Cheshunt Urban District formed part of the review area for the Royal Commission on Local Government in Greater London, which proposed that it form part of a Greater London borough with Enfield. This proposed borough, however, was abandoned, and the area did not become part of the final Greater London area in 1965. In April 1974, the Cheshunt and Hoddesdon urban district councils merged to form the Borough of Broxbourne.

== Landmarks ==
=== The Eleanor Cross ===
At the centre of the town is one of the three surviving medieval Eleanor crosses, memorials completed before the end of 1294 commemorating the overnight resting places of the coffin of Eleanor of Castile, wife of King Edward I, on its processional journey from Lincoln to Westminster Abbey in 1290. It was the only one designed by a foreigner, in name at least, Nicholas Dymenge de Reyns or de Legeri. Records, some patched together and non-contemporary, state that her body, deceased on 28 November, rested at St Albans on the night of 12 December and was carried to what was then Waltham on the following day, where it rested for the night at Waltham Abbey and arrived in London on 14 December. A recreation of a fourth such cross, the most southerly, destroyed in the English Civil War, is at Charing Cross station less than one mile (1.6 km) from the abbey in London.

In the early 18th century, the monument was surveyed by the Society of Antiquaries of London who, advocating its conservation, printed and illustrated the results in the pages of Vetusta Monumenta in 1721. However, restoration did not take place until 1832, when extensive rebuilding was carried out under William Barnard Clarke. A further major restoration was carried out in 1885–92, and yet another in 1950–53.

The cross is hexagonal in plan, in three stages. The main stage has three statues of the Queen, each standing in a niche under a canopy, while the other three faces have a niche bisected by a buttress. The original sculptures were by Alexander of Abingdon. These have been replaced in the course of restoration, but one of the originals can be seen on display at the Victoria and Albert Museum.

=== Four Swannes sign ===
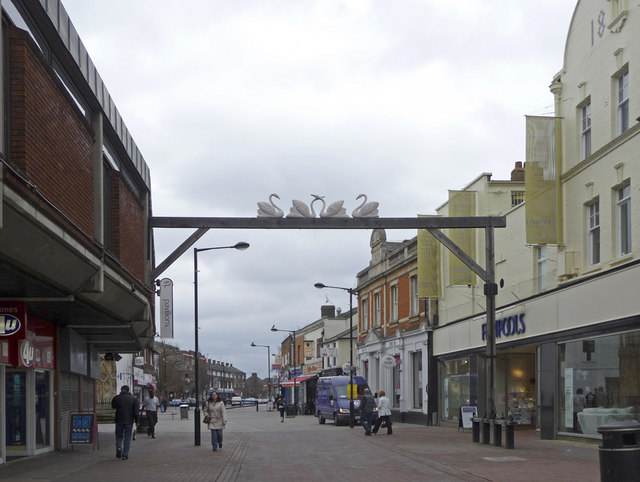
The Four Swannes sign in 2009

The High Street is spanned by a gantry sign supporting four sculpted swans. It was originally the sign of the now-demolished Four Swans (or "Swannes") public house. The present sign is a replica erected in 2007. The original signs are now kept at Lowewood Museum, Hoddesdon.

== Transport ==
The area is served by two railway stations, on different lines in London fare zone 7. Waltham Cross station has services to London Liverpool Street and Stratford via Tottenham Hale with links to the Victoria line. To the north, services run to Hertford East or Bishops Stortford.

Theobalds Grove station, to the north of the town centre, also provides services to London Liverpool street via Seven Sisters, which also provides a link to the Victoria line. The station and its services are run by London Overground.

There is a bus station in the town centre where many London Buses routes terminate and link with services further out of London, operated by Arriva, Metroline and other smaller operators.

== Notable residents ==
Cliff Richard (Harry Webb) spent some of his childhood living in Waltham Cross before moving to neighbouring Cheshunt. He attended Kings Road Junior Mixed Infants School, on the site of the current Four Swannes Primary School, before attending Cheshunt Secondary Modern.

Bill Treacher, known for his role as Arthur Fowler in EastEnders, grew up in York Road and attended Kings Road JMI School. Before his acting career, he worked as a porter at Waltham Cross station.

Victorian novelist Anthony Trollope lived at Waltham House, Waltham Cross for 12 years between 1859 and 1871, where he wrote twenty-six novels and entertained his illustrious London friends. His home was demolished in 1936 and on the general site now stands a 1930s parade of shops and the Moon and Cross, a J D Wetherspoon public house, decorated with a literary theme.

== Demography ==
The Waltham Cross ward had a population of 8,577 at the 2021 census; an increase from its population of 7,407 in the 2011 census.

The ethnic and cultural diversity of the town has increased in recent decades, with less than half its population (41.8%) in 2021 identifying as White British, a fall from 56.9% in 2011 and 82.7% in 2001.

Ethnic Group	1991 (Note: Waltham Cross South ward)		2001 (Note: Waltham Cross ward)		2011		2021	
Ethnic Group	Number	%	Number	%	Number	%	Number	%
White: Total	5,392	96.5%	5,991	92.3%	5,591	75.5%	5,394	62.9%
White: English/Welsh/Scottish/Northern Irish/British	–	–	5,372	82.7%	4,215	56.9%	3,582	41.8%
White: Irish	–	–	108	1.7%	111	1.5%	73	0.9%
White: Gypsy or Irish Traveller	–	–	–	–	38	0.5%	28	0.3%
White: Romani	–	–	–	–	–	–	31	0.4%
White: Other	–	–	511	7.9%	1,227	16.6%	1,680	19.6%
Asian: Total	60	1.1%	125	1.9%	245	3.3%	448	5.2%
Asian or Asian British: Indian	20	0.4%	50	0.8%	51	0.7%	101	1.2%
Asian or Asian British: Pakistani	2	0%	3	0%	22	0.3%	60	0.7%
Asian or Asian British: Bangladeshi	5	0.1%	18	0.3%	40	0.5%	82	1%
Asian or Asian British: Chinese	15	0.3%	18	0.3%	27	0.4%	39	0.5%
Asian or Asian British: Other Asian	18	0.3%	36	0.6%	105	1.4%	166	1.9%
Black: Total	83	1.5%	227	3.5%	1,128	15.2%	1,469	17.1%
Black or Black British: African	6	0.1%	101	1.6%	676	9.1%	869	10.1%
Black or Black British: Caribbean	61	1.1%	112	1.7%	339	4.6%	376	4.4%
Black or Black British: Other Black	16	0.3%	14	0.2%	113	1.5%	224	2.6%
Mixed: Total	–	–	114	1.8%	300	4.1%	440	5.1%
Mixed: White and Black Caribbean	–	–	49	0.8%	121	1.6%	137	1.6%
Mixed: White and Black African	–	–	12	0.2%	63	0.9%	78	0.9%
Mixed: White and Asian	–	–	29	0.4%	56	0.8%	66	0.8%
Mixed: Other Mixed	–	–	24	0.4%	60	0.8%	159	1.9%
Other: Total	51	0.9%	36	0.6%	143	1.9%	826	9.6%
Other: Arab	–	–	–	–	19	0.3%	36	0.4%
Other: Any other ethnic group	51	0.9%	36	0.6%	124	1.7%	790	9.2%
Total	5,586	100%	6,493	100%	7,407	100%	8,577	100%

== Economy ==
=== Retail and tourism ===
The town centre has a pedestrianised High Street fronted by a mixture of chain stores, independent shops and banks; a covered shopping mall and Fishpools Department Store which specialises in upholstered and fancy furniture and has been in the town since 1899. A general market takes up parts of the street on Wednesdays and Fridays, morphed into occasional entirely French and entirely farmers' markets, season-dependent.

=== Other businesses ===
Park Plaza west of the town adjacent to Junction 25 of the M25 hosts one of the world's largest printworks. This produces publications for News International including The Sun, The Times and formerly the News of the World. Employing 200 people on a 23-acre (9.3 ha) site to produce 86,000 newspapers per hour on each of its twelve printing presses (a total capacity of over 1,000,000 newspapers per hour), the plant cost £187 million (part of £650m spending including plants in Knowsley, near Liverpool, and Motherwell, near Glasgow) and replaced the News International press in Wapping.

In 2022 film and TV studio Sunset Studios plan to build a 91-acre site got approved. The £600M project initially got paused and eventually got cancelled.

In 2024, Google began construction on its first data centre in the UK on a 33-acre (13 ha) site in Waltham Cross which it purchased in 2020. They invested $1 billion (£790 million) to build the site, which they hope to be completed by 2025. Prime Minister Rishi Sunak said it showed the UK had "huge potential for growth" and that "investments like this will help to drive growth in the decade ahead." Chancellor Jeremy Hunt said that the investment "is a huge vote of confidence in Britain as the largest tech economy in Europe."

== Sport ==
The Showground site adjoining Waltham Town Lock on the River Lee was chosen as the site for the Lee Valley White Water Centre for the 2012 Olympics. It was the only new Olympic venue to be open ahead of the Games, and offers the public the chance to follow in the footsteps of the Olympic competitors by taking to the rapids themselves. A Gaelic Football club is a rare venue for the sport in the county, St Joseph's (Waltham Cross), and reflects a long history of the Anglo-Irish across many socio-economic sectors in the local area, including as to engineering and construction, the surrounding area having many reservoirs, railways and once vast building yards.
