= Waltham Township, Mower County, Minnesota =

Waltham Township, Minnesota
- Township
- Location within the state of Minnesota Waltham Township, Minnesota (the United States)
- Coordinates: 43°47′45″N 92°52′47″W
- Country: United States
- State: Minnesota
- County: Mower

Area
  - Total: 35.9 sq mi (93.0 km^{2})
  - Land: 35.9 sq mi (93.0 km^{2})
  - Water: 0 sq mi (0.0 km^{2})
- Elevation: 1,289 ft (393 m)

Population (2000)
  - Total: 416
  - Density: 12/sq mi (4.5/km^{2})
- Time zone: UTC-6 (Central (CST))
  - Summer (DST): UTC-5 (CDT)
- ZIP code: 55982
- Area code: 507
- FIPS code: 27-67936
- GNIS feature ID: 0665907

Waltham Township is a township in Mower County, Minnesota, United States. The population was 416 at the 2000 census. The largest town in the township is Waltham with a population of 196 people. All other area in the township is unincorporated.

== History ==
Nels Johnson, the earliest settler, came in the summer of 1855. The entire township was later sold to land speculators. John C. Mason bought more than a quarter of the township, primarily in the northeast corner. His agent, A.J. Burbank, came in 1864, built a three-story hotel, surveyed the land and sold most of it off into small parcels. The township was officially organized in 1866. The village of Waltham was originally about a mile east of where it sits now. The Chicago Great Western Railway stretched across the prairie of Waltham Township and the people of the village decided to relocate. The current village of Waltham was platted in 1885. In 1911 the village had two general stores, a physician, a shoe shop, a livery, a creamery, a stock buyer, a carpenter shop, a flour mill, and a variety of small shops.

== Geography ==
According to the United States Census Bureau, the township has a total area of 35.9 square miles (93.0 km^{2}), all land.

== Demographics ==
As of the census of 2000, there were 416 people, 146 households, and 117 families residing in the township. The population density was 11.6 people per square mile (4.5/km^{2}). There were 150 housing units at an average density of 4.2/sq mi (1.6/km^{2}). The racial makeup of the township was 98.56% White, 0.48% Asian, 0.96% from other races. Hispanic or Latino of any race were 1.20% of the population.

There were 146 households, out of which 35.6% had children under the age of 18 living with them, 68.5% were married couples living together, 4.1% had a female householder with no husband present, and 19.2% were non-families. 13.0% of all households were made up of individuals, and 8.2% had someone living alone who was 65 years of age or older. The average household size was 2.85 and the average family size was 3.15.

In the township the population was spread out, with 27.6% under the age of 18, 7.5% from 18 to 24, 26.7% from 25 to 44, 22.8% from 45 to 64, and 15.4% who were 65 years of age or older. The median age was 39 years. For every 100 females, there were 108.0 males. For every 100 females age 18 and over, there were 118.1 males.

The median income for a household in the township was $47,500, and the median income for a family was $49,643. Males had a median income of $28,611 versus $23,889 for females. The per capita income for the township was $16,228. About 4.2% of families and 6.0% of the population were below the poverty line, including 4.3% of those under age 18 and 8.3% of those age 65 or over.

== Mayville ==
Mayville is an unincorporated community on the southern border with Red Rock Township. It is located along Mower County Highway 16.

== Cemeteries ==
- St. Michael's Lutheran Cemetery is located in the northwest corner of the southwest quadrant of section 20 of the township. Its oldest known burial dates to 1870.
- Trinity Lutheran Cemetery is located in the northeast corner of the northeast quadrant of section 19 of the township. Its oldest known burial dates to 1880.
