= Minnesota State Highway 105 =

State highway in Minnesota, United States

Trunk Highway 105
- MN 105 highlighted in red

Route information
- Maintained by MnDOT
- Length: 13.645 mi (21.959 km)
- Existed: April 22, 1933–present

Major junctions
- South end: CR S70 at the Minnesota - Iowa state line near London
- I-90 BL at Austin
- North end: I-90 near Austin

Location
- Country: United States
- State: Minnesota
- Counties: Mower

Highway system
- Minnesota Trunk Highway System; Interstate; US; State; Legislative; Scenic
← MN 104	→ MN 106

Minnesota State Highway 105 (MN 105) is a 13.645-mile-long (21.959 km) highway in southeast Minnesota, which runs from Mitchell County Road S70 at the Iowa state line and continues north to its northern terminus at its interchange with Interstate Highway 90 outside Austin.

Highway 105 passes through the communities of Lyle Township, Austin Township, and the city of Austin.

== Route description ==
State Highway 105 serves as a north–south route between the Iowa state line and the city of Austin.

The route is located in Mower County.

Highway 105 is also known as 12th Street SW and Oakland Avenue W in the city of Austin.

The route parallels the Cedar River and U.S. Highway 218.

The route is legally defined as Route 199 in the Minnesota Statutes. It is not marked with this number.

== History ==
State Highway 105 was authorized on April 22, 1933.

The route was paved by 1940.

From 1934 to 1980, the northern terminus of Highway 105 was previously at old U.S. 16 / old Minnesota 116 (Oakland Avenue) in Austin. Minnesota 116 was turned back to city maintenance in 1980. The 1.6 mile connecting route of old Minnesota 116 (Oakland Avenue) between Highway 105 at 12th Street and Interstate 90 on the western side of Austin was then added as an extension of 105 in 1980.

== Major intersections ==
The entire route is in Mower County.

Location	mi	km	Destinations	Notes
Lyle Township	0.000	0.000	CR S70 (State Line Road) – Otranto, St. Ansgar, Carpenter	Iowa state line
Austin	12.073	19.430	I-90 BL east	South end of I-90 Bus. overlap; former US 16
Austin	12.227	19.677	14th Street West to US 218	Former US 218
Austin Township	13.532– 13.653	21.778– 21.972	I-90 / I-90 BL ends / CSAH 46 – Albert Lea, La Crosse	Northern terminus; western terminus of I-90 Bus.; north end of I-90 Bus. overlap; I-90 exit 175; diamond interchange
1.000 mi = 1.609 km; 1.000 km = 0.621 mi: Concurrency terminus
