= 1932 United States presidential election in Minnesota =

- November 8, 1932

Nominee	Franklin D. Roosevelt	Herbert Hoover
Party	Democratic	Republican
Alliance	Farmer–Labor
Home state	New York	California
Running mate	John Nance Garner	Charles Curtis
Electoral vote	11	0
Popular vote	600,806	363,959
Percentage	59.91%	36.29%
County results
Roosevelt
40–50%
50–60%
60–70%
70–80%
80–90%
Hoover
40–50%
President before election
Herbert Hoover
Republican
Elected President
Franklin D. Roosevelt
Democratic

The 1932 United States presidential election in Minnesota took place on November 8, 1932, as part of the 1932 United States presidential election. Voters chose 11 electors, or representatives to the Electoral College, who voted for president and vice president.

Democrat Franklin D. Roosevelt became the first Democrat to ever carry Minnesota in a presidential election, taking 59.9% of the state's vote to incumbent Republican President Herbert Hoover's 36.3%, a margin of victory of 23.62% and 236,847 votes. Roosevelt won the national election in a landslide, taking 472 electoral votes and winning the national popular vote by 17.76%, Despite a history of overwhelming Republican dominance, Minnesota weighed in in this election as 5.86 percentage points more Democratic than the nation at-large.

This significant shift would foreshadow a national electoral realignment. The election of 1932, the first held since the Wall Street Crash of 1929, effectively marked the end of the Republican-dominated Fourth Party System, and the beginning of the Fifth Party System. This led to the dominance of the New Deal Coalition in presidential politics until 1968. Leading up to this election, the state's 1930 gubernatorial election, in which Farmer-Labor candidate Floyd B. Olson won the governorship by a landslide margin, was considered an indicator of the GOP's poor prospects in 1932. Throughout most of the 1930s, Roosevelt would dominate presidential politics in Minnesota, while Olson and the Farmer-Laborites tended to dominate state politics. The eventual cooperation between the Minnesota Farmer-Labor Party and the Democratic Party, fostered by Olson and Roosevelt, would lead to the establishment of the Minnesota Democratic-Farmer-Labor Party in 1944.

This was also only the second time since statehood that the state did not support the Republican candidate, the first being when it backed Progressive Party candidate Theodore Roosevelt in 1912. Minnesota has since voted Democratic in every presidential election except 1952, 1956, and 1972, all of which were national Republican landslides. As of the 2024 presidential election, this is the last election in which Lake County voted for a Republican presidential candidate (incidentally it was the only county to vote Republican in the 1932 presidential election) and the last election in which Carver County and Otter Tail County voted for a Democratic candidate.

== Results ==
1932 United States presidential election in Minnesota
Party	Candidate	Votes	Percentage	Electoral votes
Democratic	Franklin D. Roosevelt	600,806	59.91%	11
Republican	Herbert Hoover (incumbent)	363,959	36.29%	0
Socialist	Norman Thomas	25,476	2.54%	0
Communist	William Z. Foster	6,101	0.61%	0
Farmer-Labor	Jacob Coxey	5,731	0.57%	0
Socialist Labor	Verne L. Reynolds	770	0.08%	0
Totals		1,002,843	100.00%	11

=== Results by county ===
County	Franklin Delano Roosevelt Democratic		Herbert Clark Hoover Republican		Norman Mattoon Thomas Socialist		Various candidates Other parties		Margin		Total votes cast
County	#	%	#	%	#	%	#	%	#	%	Total votes cast
Aitkin	2,945	51.28%	2,341	40.76%	184	3.20%	273	4.75%	604	10.52%	5,743
Anoka	4,253	59.47%	2,718	38.00%	134	1.87%	47	0.66%	1,535	21.46%	7,152
Becker	5,547	67.56%	2,299	28.00%	146	1.78%	218	2.66%	3,248	39.56%	8,210
Beltrami	4,386	60.73%	2,318	32.10%	317	4.39%	201	2.78%	2,068	28.63%	7,222
Benton	3,901	72.92%	1,329	24.84%	65	1.21%	55	1.03%	2,572	48.07%	5,350
Big Stone	3,200	77.37%	868	20.99%	47	1.14%	21	0.51%	2,332	56.38%	4,136
Blue Earth	7,925	57.88%	5,550	40.54%	158	1.15%	58	0.42%	2,375	17.35%	13,691
Brown	6,716	75.00%	2,027	22.64%	171	1.91%	41	0.46%	4,689	52.36%	8,955
Carlton	3,586	45.75%	3,336	42.56%	571	7.29%	345	4.40%	250	3.19%	7,838
Carver	4,328	62.71%	2,508	36.34%	50	0.72%	16	0.23%	1,820	26.37%	6,902
Cass	3,494	57.82%	2,302	38.09%	148	2.45%	99	1.64%	1,192	19.73%	6,043
Chippewa	3,888	64.95%	1,940	32.41%	104	1.74%	54	0.90%	1,948	32.54%	5,986
Chisago	3,047	52.95%	2,524	43.86%	105	1.82%	79	1.37%	523	9.09%	5,755
Clay	5,938	67.75%	2,556	29.16%	223	2.54%	47	0.54%	3,382	38.59%	8,764
Clearwater	2,688	72.81%	845	22.89%	91	2.46%	68	1.84%	1,843	49.92%	3,692
Cook	492	50.93%	418	43.27%	31	3.21%	25	2.59%	74	7.66%	966
Cottonwood	2,877	59.00%	1,921	39.40%	47	0.96%	31	0.64%	956	19.61%	4,876
Crow Wing	5,068	52.91%	3,991	41.67%	289	3.02%	230	2.40%	1,077	11.24%	9,578
Dakota	8,958	65.70%	4,439	32.56%	180	1.32%	58	0.43%	4,519	33.14%	13,635
Dodge	2,675	54.69%	2,129	43.53%	36	0.74%	51	1.04%	546	11.16%	4,891
Douglas	5,101	66.63%	2,325	30.37%	145	1.89%	85	1.11%	2,776	36.26%	7,656
Faribault	4,590	51.62%	4,148	46.65%	97	1.09%	57	0.64%	442	4.97%	8,892
Fillmore	5,166	50.03%	4,979	48.22%	93	0.90%	87	0.84%	187	1.81%	10,325
Freeborn	5,838	52.82%	4,931	44.62%	197	1.78%	86	0.78%	907	8.21%	11,052
Goodhue	7,450	55.97%	5,486	41.22%	253	1.90%	121	0.91%	1,964	14.76%	13,310
Grant	2,702	68.67%	1,148	29.17%	60	1.52%	25	0.64%	1,554	39.49%	3,935
Hennepin	119,234	54.80%	91,087	41.87%	5,771	2.65%	1,474	0.68%	28,147	12.94%	217,566
Houston	3,052	55.71%	2,335	42.63%	43	0.78%	48	0.88%	717	13.09%	5,478
Hubbard	2,230	59.45%	1,349	35.96%	90	2.40%	82	2.19%	881	23.49%	3,751
Isanti	3,147	64.53%	1,484	30.43%	132	2.71%	114	2.34%	1,663	34.10%	4,877
Itasca	5,616	54.86%	3,782	36.94%	321	3.14%	518	5.06%	1,834	17.92%	10,237
Jackson	4,129	71.67%	1,524	26.45%	71	1.23%	37	0.64%	2,605	45.22%	5,761
Kanabec	2,106	58.42%	1,268	35.17%	137	3.80%	94	2.61%	838	23.25%	3,605
Kandiyohi	5,813	65.31%	2,674	30.04%	319	3.58%	95	1.07%	3,139	35.27%	8,901
Kittson	2,332	68.27%	950	27.81%	103	3.02%	31	0.91%	1,382	40.46%	3,416
Koochiching	3,148	63.29%	1,427	28.69%	205	4.12%	194	3.90%	1,721	34.60%	4,974
Lac qui Parle	3,992	66.53%	1,911	31.85%	55	0.92%	42	0.70%	2,081	34.68%	6,000
Lake	1,059	35.28%	1,290	42.97%	580	19.32%	73	2.43%	-231	-7.69%	3,002
Lake of the Woods	972	62.03%	369	23.55%	175	11.17%	51	3.25%	603	38.48%	1,567
Le Sueur	5,878	72.57%	2,121	26.19%	55	0.68%	46	0.57%	3,757	46.38%	8,100
Lincoln	2,963	72.91%	974	23.97%	87	2.14%	40	0.98%	1,989	48.94%	4,064
Lyon	4,989	67.57%	2,264	30.67%	82	1.11%	48	0.65%	2,725	36.91%	7,383
McLeod	5,187	68.18%	2,293	30.14%	84	1.10%	44	0.58%	2,894	38.04%	7,608
Mahnomen	1,734	83.81%	264	12.76%	51	2.46%	20	0.97%	1,470	71.05%	2,069
Marshall	3,259	59.66%	1,866	34.16%	197	3.61%	141	2.58%	1,393	25.50%	5,463
Martin	4,731	60.26%	3,004	38.26%	90	1.15%	26	0.33%	1,727	22.00%	7,851
Meeker	4,723	66.08%	2,273	31.80%	78	1.09%	73	1.02%	2,450	34.28%	7,147
Mille Lacs	3,538	60.62%	1,986	34.03%	184	3.15%	128	2.19%	1,552	26.59%	5,836
Morrison	6,712	73.57%	2,198	24.09%	134	1.47%	79	0.87%	4,514	49.48%	9,123
Mower	6,421	60.58%	4,005	37.79%	114	1.08%	59	0.56%	2,416	22.79%	10,599
Murray	3,264	70.07%	1,314	28.21%	50	1.07%	30	0.64%	1,950	41.86%	4,658
Nicollet	3,960	62.58%	2,217	35.03%	99	1.56%	52	0.82%	1,743	27.54%	6,328
Nobles	4,343	63.51%	2,417	35.35%	57	0.83%	21	0.31%	1,926	28.17%	6,838
Norman	3,601	68.80%	1,313	25.09%	256	4.89%	64	1.22%	2,288	43.71%	5,234
Olmsted	7,340	57.01%	5,254	40.81%	102	0.79%	178	1.38%	2,086	16.20%	12,874
Otter Tail	8,805	51.90%	7,416	43.72%	326	1.92%	417	2.46%	1,389	8.19%	16,964
Pennington	2,743	63.64%	1,212	28.12%	240	5.57%	115	2.67%	1,531	35.52%	4,310
Pine	4,862	62.33%	2,304	29.53%	468	6.00%	167	2.14%	2,558	32.79%	7,801
Pipestone	2,996	65.44%	1,509	32.96%	44	0.96%	29	0.63%	1,487	32.48%	4,578
Polk	8,751	66.35%	3,604	27.32%	666	5.05%	169	1.28%	5,147	39.02%	13,190
Pope	3,571	66.56%	1,688	31.46%	59	1.10%	47	0.88%	1,883	35.10%	5,365
Ramsey	66,128	61.24%	38,589	35.74%	2,510	2.32%	753	0.70%	27,539	25.50%	107,980
Red Lake	1,893	80.86%	351	14.99%	54	2.31%	43	1.84%	1,542	65.87%	2,341
Redwood	4,727	63.20%	2,634	35.21%	65	0.87%	54	0.72%	2,093	27.98%	7,480
Renville	5,967	68.11%	2,631	30.03%	106	1.21%	57	0.65%	3,336	38.08%	8,761
Rice	6,289	56.08%	4,743	42.29%	144	1.28%	39	0.35%	1,546	13.79%	11,215
Rock	2,695	64.15%	1,452	34.56%	38	0.90%	16	0.38%	1,243	29.59%	4,201
Roseau	2,805	66.41%	1,078	25.52%	223	5.28%	118	2.79%	1,727	40.89%	4,224
Saint Louis	40,181	47.99%	34,883	41.66%	5,485	6.55%	3,180	3.80%	5,298	6.33%	83,729
Scott	4,878	80.64%	1,134	18.75%	26	0.43%	11	0.18%	3,744	61.89%	6,049
Sherburne	1,938	53.46%	1,601	44.17%	56	1.54%	30	0.83%	337	9.30%	3,625
Sibley	4,756	76.27%	1,398	22.42%	40	0.64%	42	0.67%	3,358	53.85%	6,236
Stearns	18,293	79.36%	4,499	19.52%	182	0.79%	76	0.33%	13,794	59.84%	23,050
Steele	4,318	55.43%	3,365	43.20%	74	0.95%	33	0.42%	953	12.23%	7,790
Stevens	2,552	63.96%	1,396	34.99%	26	0.65%	16	0.40%	1,156	28.97%	3,990
Swift	4,339	75.04%	1,308	22.62%	93	1.61%	42	0.73%	3,031	52.42%	5,782
Todd	6,023	64.16%	3,114	33.17%	137	1.46%	113	1.20%	2,909	30.99%	9,387
Traverse	2,633	80.23%	608	18.53%	26	0.79%	15	0.46%	2,025	61.70%	3,282
Wabasha	4,540	65.06%	2,319	33.23%	53	0.76%	66	0.95%	2,221	31.83%	6,978
Wadena	2,300	57.07%	1,585	39.33%	23	0.57%	122	3.03%	715	17.74%	4,030
Waseca	3,805	64.46%	2,012	34.08%	53	0.90%	33	0.56%	1,793	30.37%	5,903
Washington	6,413	60.18%	3,996	37.50%	172	1.61%	75	0.70%	2,417	22.68%	10,656
Watonwan	2,795	57.71%	1,919	39.62%	89	1.84%	40	0.83%	876	18.09%	4,843
Wilkin	2,488	67.94%	1,126	30.75%	28	0.76%	20	0.55%	1,362	37.19%	3,662
Winona	8,305	62.41%	4,751	35.70%	120	0.90%	132	0.99%	3,554	26.71%	13,308
Wright	7,205	66.53%	3,406	31.45%	108	1.00%	111	1.02%	3,799	35.08%	10,830
Yellow Medicine	4,580	71.14%	1,739	27.01%	78	1.21%	41	0.64%	2,841	44.13%	6,438
Totals	600,806	59.91%	363,959	36.29%	25,476	2.54%	12,602	1.26%	236,847	23.62%	1,002,843

==== Counties that flipped from Republican to Democratic ====
- Aitkin
- Anoka
- Becker
- Beltrami
- Blue Earth
- Carlton
- Cass
- Carver
- Chippewa
- Clay
- Chisago
- Clearwater
- Crow Wing
- Cook
- Cottonwood
- Dodge
- Douglas
- Faribault
- Fillmore
- Freeborn
- Goodhue
- Hennepin
- Grant
- Hubbard
- Houston
- Isanti
- Itasca
- Kandiyohi
- Kanabec
- Kittson
- Koochiching
- Jackson
- Lac qui Parle
- Lake of the Woods
- McLeod
- Lyon
- Marshall
- Martin
- Meeker
- Mille Lacs
- Mower
- Murray
- Micollet
- Nobles
- Norman
- Olmsted
- Otter Tail
- Pennington
- Pine
- Polk
- Pipestone
- Pope
- Redwood
- Renville
- Rock
- Rice
- Roseau
- Saint Louis
- Sibley
- Sherburne
- Swift
- Stevens
- Steele
- Todd
- Wabasha
- Wadena
- Waseca
- Washington
- Watonwan
- Wilkin
- Winona
- Wright
- Yellow Medicine

== See also ==
- United States presidential elections in Minnesota
