= Gower Creek =

Stream in Iowa, United States

Coordinates: 41°46′42″N 91°18′30″W

Gower Creek is a stream in the U.S. state of Iowa. It is a tributary to the Cedar River.

Gower Creek was named after James and Borredell Gower, pioneer settlers.
