= Lyle, Minnesota =

City in Minnesota, United States

- City
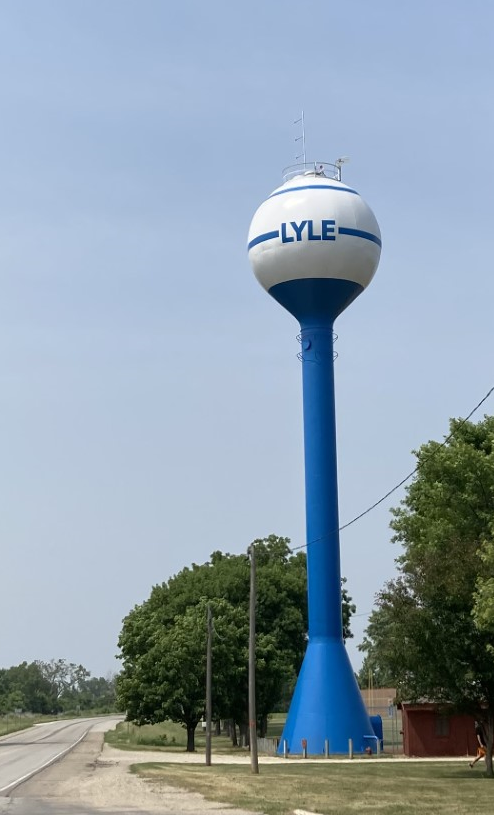
- Lyle water tower in park on U.S. Route 218

- Flag
- Nickname: Biggest little town on the border
- Motto: "Our pride is showing!"
- Location in Mower County and the state of Minnesota
- Coordinates: 43°30′15″N 92°56′25″W
- Country: United States
- State: Minnesota
- County: Mower
- Established: 1854
- Incorporated: June 18, 1870

Government
  - Type: Mayor - Council

Area
  - Total: 0.76 sq mi (1.96 km^{2})
  - Land: 0.76 sq mi (1.96 km^{2})
  - Water: 0 sq mi (0.00 km^{2})
- Elevation: 1,194 ft (364 m)

Population (2020)
  - Total: 522
  - Density: 690.6/sq mi (266.66/km^{2})
- Time zone: UTC-6 (CST)
  - Summer (DST): UTC-5 (CDT)
- ZIP Code: 55953
- Area code: 507
- FIPS code: 27-38654
- GNIS feature ID: 2395790
- Website: www.lylemn.org

Lyle is a city in Mower County, Minnesota, United States. The city lies on the north side of the Iowa border. The population was 522 at the 2020 census.

== History ==
Lyle was platted in 1870. The city was named after Robert Lyle, a farmer, territorial, and state legislator. Lyle was incorporated in 1875.

== Geography ==
Lyle is in southwestern Mower County, with its southern border on the Iowa state line. The city is bordered to the north and west by Lyle Township and to the east by Nevada Township, while to the south it is bordered by Otranto Township in Mitchell County, Iowa.

U.S. Route 218 passes through the center of Lyle as 1st Street, leading north 12 miles (19 km) to Austin, the Mower county seat, and south 21 miles (34 km) to Osage, Iowa.

According to the U.S. Census Bureau, Lyle has an area of 0.76 square miles (1.97 km^{2}), all of it recorded as land. Otter Creek crosses the southeast corner of the city, flowing southwest to the Cedar River at Otranto, Iowa.

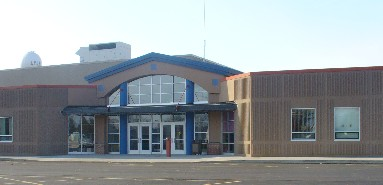
Main entrance to the new school.

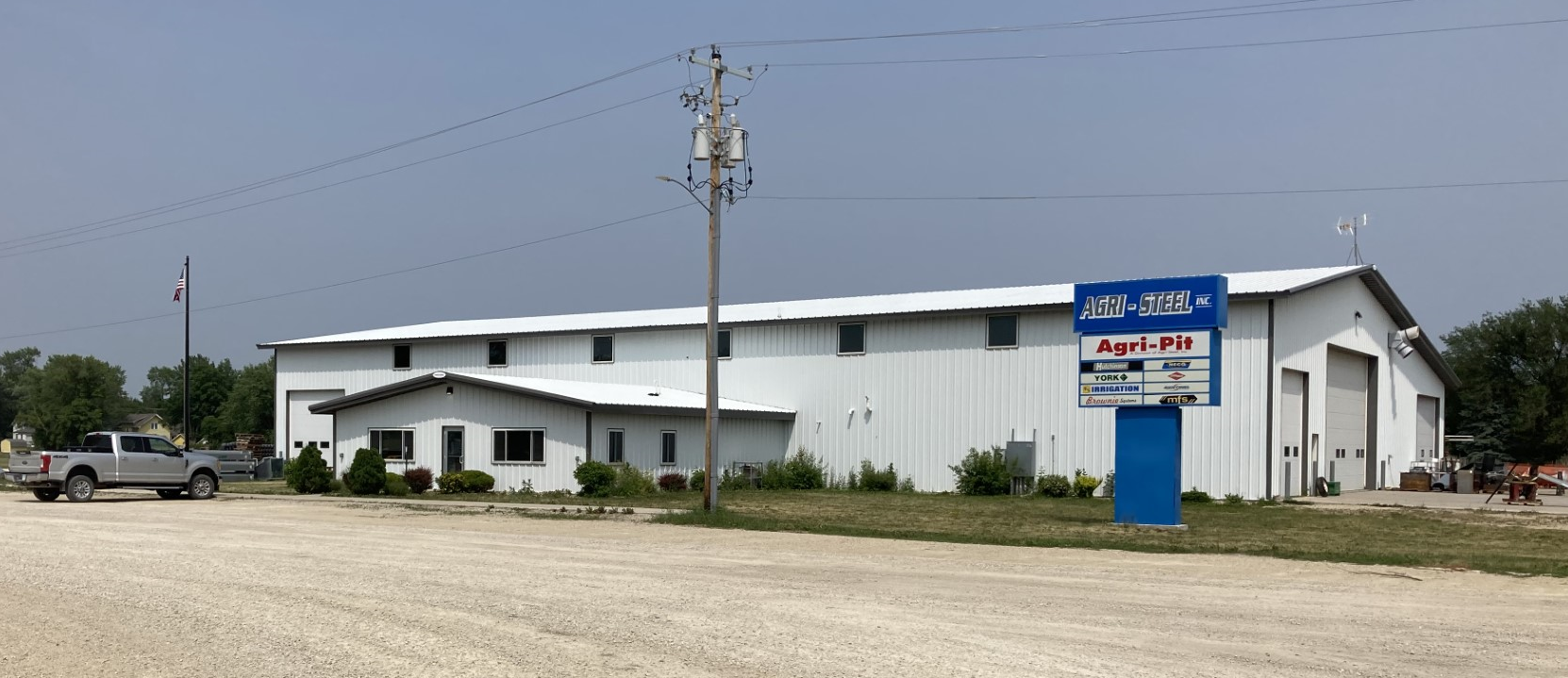
Agri-Steel, largest private employer in Lyle

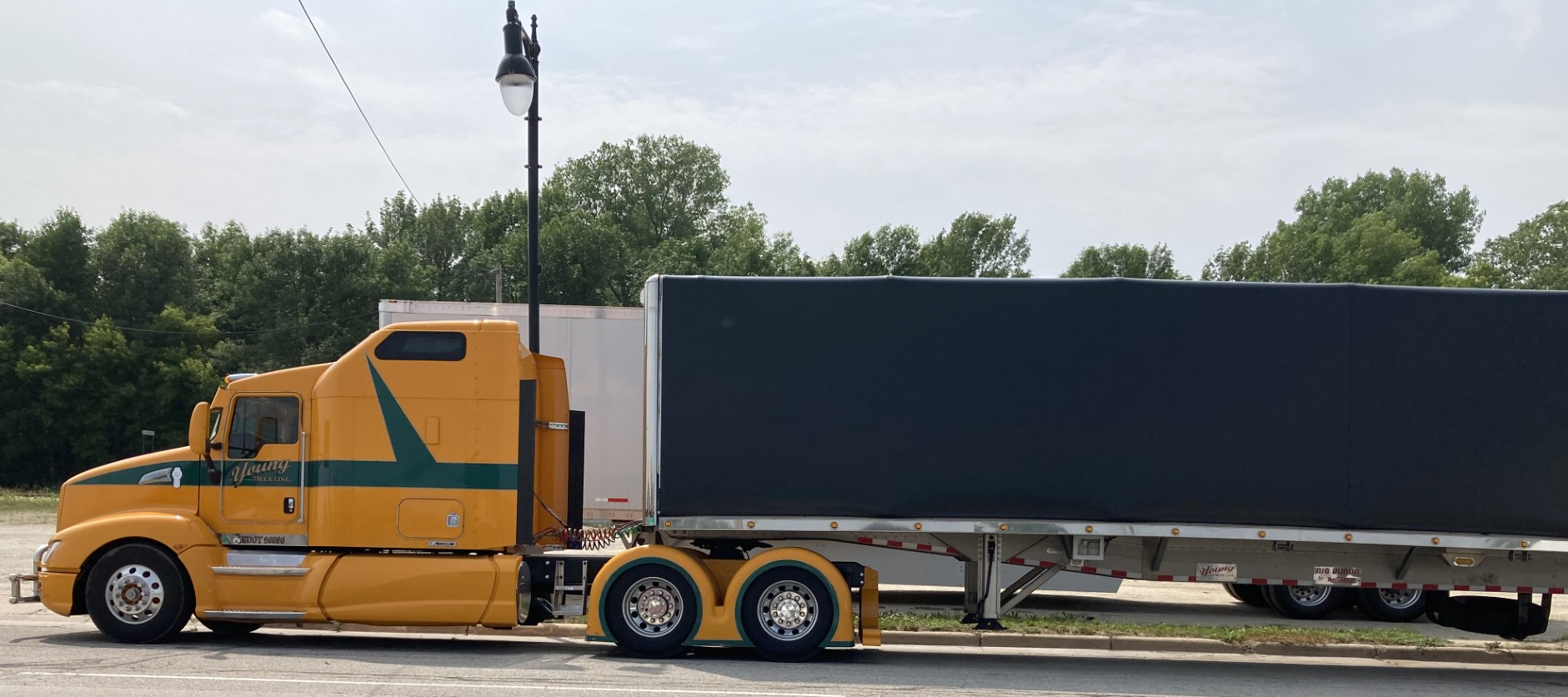
Young Trucking, based in Lyle

== Demographics ==
Historical population
Census	Pop.	Note	%±
1880	182		—
1890	306		68.1%
1900	488		59.5%
1910	552		13.1%
1920	505		−8.5%
1930	453		−10.3%
1940	513		13.2%
1950	609		18.7%
1960	607		−0.3%
1970	522		−14.0%
1980	576		10.3%
1990	504		−12.5%
2000	566		12.3%
2010	551		−2.7%
2020	522		−5.3%
U.S. Decennial Census

=== 2010 census ===
As of the census of 2010, there were 551 people, 220 households, and 147 families residing in the city. The population density was 725.0 inhabitants per square mile (279.9/km^{2}). There were 235 housing units at an average density of 309.2 per square mile (119.4/km^{2}). The racial makeup of the city was 98.2% White, 0.2% Native American, 0.2% from other races, and 1.5% from two or more races. Hispanic or Latino of any race were 0.7% of the population.

There were 220 households, of which 33.6% had children under the age of 18 living with them, 51.8% were married couples living together, 11.8% had a female householder with no husband present, 3.2% had a male householder with no wife present, and 33.2% were non-families. 30.5% of all households were made up of individuals, and 16% had someone living alone who was 65 years of age or older. The average household size was 2.50 and the average family size was 3.06.

The median age in the city was 36.3 years. 27.2% of residents were under the age of 18; 8.4% were between the ages of 18 and 24; 23.6% were from 25 to 44; 26.1% were from 45 to 64; and 14.7% were 65 years of age or older. The gender makeup of the city was 48.3% male and 51.7% female.

=== 2000 census ===
As of the census of 2000, there were 566 people, 211 households, and 148 families residing in the city. The population density was 733.2 inhabitants per square mile (283.1/km^{2}). There were 225 housing units at an average density of 291.5 per square mile (112.5/km^{2}). The racial makeup of the city was 99.82% White and 0.18% Native American. Hispanic or Latino of any race were 0.35% of the population.

There were 211 households, out of which 37.9% had children under the age of 18 living with them, 59.7% were married couples living together, 8.1% had a female householder with no husband present, and 29.4% were non-families. 25.6% of all households were made up of individuals, and 13.3% had someone living alone who was 65 years of age or older. The average household size was 2.68 and the average family size was 3.26.

In the city, the population was spread out, with 30.0% under the age of 18, 6.7% from 18 to 24, 30.6% from 25 to 44, 17.0% from 45 to 64, and 15.7% who were 65 years of age or older. The median age was 37 years. For every 100 females, there were 96.5 males. For every 100 females age 18 and over, there were 96.0 males.

The median income for a household in the city was $34,464, and the median income for a family was $42,500. Males had a median income of $30,938 versus $24,107 for females. The per capita income for the city was $14,624. About 4.2% of families and 9.4% of the population were below the poverty line, including 9.4% of those under age 18 and 11.0% of those age 65 or over.

== School ==
Lyle Independent School District #497 serves both the city of Lyle and the surrounding farm community.

This district is merged for purposes of athletics with Austin Pacelli, a Catholic high school in Austin, Minnesota. Lyle sports teams, formerly the Lyle Lions, are now the Lyle-Pacelli Athletics. Since the district is so small, Lyle-Pacelli frequently plays against schools with much larger enrollments and plays nine-man football.

The Lyle area was engaged in a bitter fight over a school bond referendum from 2002 to 2005. Two groups emerged in the community: "Save our Schools and Community", a group supporting construction of a new school, and "Concerned Citizens for Lyle's Future", a group opposing the construction of a new school in favor of other less expensive solutions. In 2005, Concerned Citizens for Lyle's Future hired an anti-school-bond consultant from Ocheyedan, Iowa. The bond passed on May 24, 2005, by a vote of 449 to 343. In this election, 98% of eligible voters participated. The new school has been built on the site of the former facility.

Lyle School Bond Referendum Voting Results, 2002-2005
	Bond issue size	Votes for	Votes against	Margin	Result
2002-11-05	$11.1 million	276	356	80	Rejected
2002-12-03	$8.05 million	325	365	29	Rejected
2004-09-14	$6.3 million	310	319	9	Rejected
2005-05-24	$8.34 million	449	343	106	Passed

== Media ==
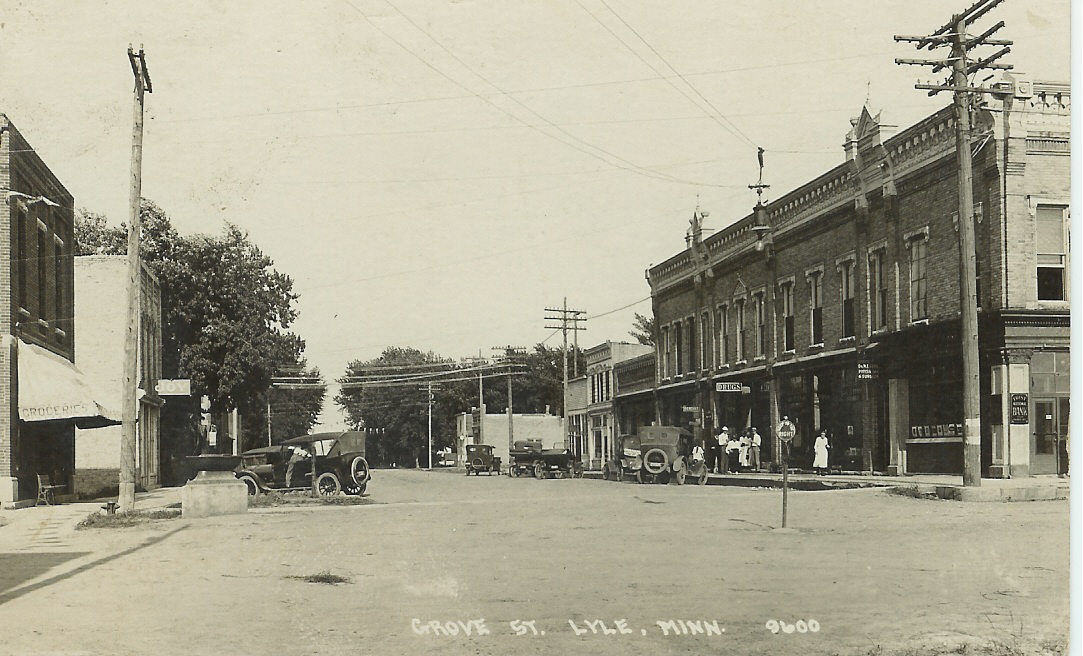
Grove Street in Lyle, Minnesota circa 1921

Lyle-area news is covered by the following local media organizations:

=== Newspapers ===
- Austin Daily Herald
- Rochester Post-Bulletin - Austin Edition

=== Television ===
- KAAL - ABC
- KTTC - NBC
- KIMT - CBS
- KSMQ - PBS (public)
- KYIN - PBS (public)

=== Radio (FM) ===
- KQPR 96.1 FM
- KRCH 101.7 FM
- KROC 106.9 FM
- The Blaze 102.7 FM

=== Radio (AM) ===
- KNFX 970 AM
- KWEB 1270 AM
- KROC 1340 AM
- KATE 1450 AM
- KAUS 1480 AM
