= 1928 United States presidential election in Minnesota =

- November 6, 1928

Nominee	Herbert Hoover	Al Smith
Party	Republican	Democratic
Home state	California	New York
Running mate	Charles Curtis	Joseph T. Robinson
Electoral vote	12	0
Popular vote	560,977	396,451
Percentage	57.77%	40.83%
County results
Hoover
40–50%
50–60%
60–70%
70–80%
Smith
50–60%
60–70%
70–80%
President before election
Calvin Coolidge
Republican
Elected President
Herbert Hoover
Republican

The 1928 United States presidential election in Minnesota took place on November 6, 1928, as part of the 1928 United States presidential election. Voters chose 12 electors, or representatives to the Electoral College, who voted for president and vice president. Minnesota was won by the Republican candidate, former Secretary of Commerce Herbert Hoover won the state over Democratic Party candidate, New York governor Al Smith by a margin of 164,526 votes, or 16.94%. Nationally, Hoover won the election, with 444 electoral votes and a landslide 17.41% lead over Smith in the popular vote.

A Republican presidential nominee would not carry Minnesota again until Dwight D. Eisenhower did so in 1952. In fact, only two Republicans have since carried it; Eisenhower in 1952 and 1956, and Richard Nixon in 1972. This was the last presidential election in which a Republican won Minnesota without Richard Nixon being on the ticket. As of the 2024 presidential election, this is the last election in which St. Louis County voted for a Republican presidential candidate.

As of 2024, this is the last election in which both Otter Tail County and Lake County voted for the same candidate. In 1932, Otter Tail would back Franklin Roosevelt and then vote for every ensuing Republican while Lake would be the sole Minnesota county to back Hoover's re-election bid before rapidly becoming one of the most Democratic counties in the state and never voting Republican again. Carlton County would not back a Republican presidential candidate until 2024, and Itasca County until 2016.

== Results ==
1928 United States presidential election in Minnesota
Party	Candidate	Votes	Percentage	Electoral votes
Republican	Herbert Hoover	560,977	57.77%	12
Democratic	Al Smith	396,451	40.83%	0
Socialist	Norman Thomas	6,774	0.70%	0
Workers (Communist)	William Z. Foster	4,853	0.50%	0
Socialist Labor	Verne L. Reynolds	1,921	0.20%	0
Totals		970,976	100.00%	12

=== Results by county ===
County	Herbert Clark Hoover Republican		Alfred Emmanuel Smith Democratic		Various candidates Other parties		Margin		Total votes cast (Note: Some of these figures differ from those at Dave Leip’s Atlas.)
County	#	%	#	%	#	%	#	%	Total votes cast
Aitkin	3,951	70.10%	1,428	25.34%	257	4.56%	2,523	44.77%	5,636
Anoka	3,816	59.05%	2,571	39.79%	75	1.16%	1,245	19.27%	6,462
Becker	4,273	55.47%	3,253	42.23%	177	2.30%	1,020	13.24%	7,703
Beltrami	4,062	62.28%	2,221	34.05%	239	3.66%	1,841	28.23%	6,522
Benton	2,373	46.29%	2,732	53.30%	21	0.41%	-359	-7.00%	5,126
Big Stone	1,641	43.20%	2,133	56.15%	25	0.66%	-492	-12.95%	3,799
Blue Earth	8,120	60.71%	5,177	38.70%	79	0.59%	2,943	22.00%	13,376
Brown	3,611	40.05%	5,341	59.24%	64	0.71%	-1,730	-19.19%	9,016
Carlton	4,582	64.01%	2,138	29.87%	438	6.12%	2,444	34.14%	7,158
Carver	3,983	57.72%	2,885	41.81%	33	0.48%	1,098	15.91%	6,901
Cass	3,781	67.02%	1,747	30.96%	114	2.02%	2,034	36.05%	5,642
Chippewa	3,547	62.77%	2,032	35.96%	72	1.27%	1,515	26.81%	5,651
Chisago	4,215	75.51%	1,297	23.24%	70	1.25%	2,918	52.28%	5,582
Clay	5,057	61.13%	3,128	37.81%	87	1.05%	1,929	23.32%	8,272
Clearwater	1,898	60.01%	1,189	37.59%	76	2.40%	709	22.42%	3,163
Cook	609	72.59%	219	26.10%	11	1.31%	390	46.48%	839
Cottonwood	3,405	67.45%	1,604	31.77%	39	0.77%	1,801	35.68%	5,048
Crow Wing	6,436	67.87%	2,851	30.06%	196	2.07%	3,585	37.80%	9,483
Dakota	6,019	45.18%	7,215	54.15%	89	0.67%	-1,196	-8.98%	13,323
Dodge	3,569	74.49%	1,196	24.96%	26	0.54%	2,373	49.53%	4,791
Douglas	4,262	59.27%	2,829	39.34%	100	1.39%	1,433	19.93%	7,191
Faribault	5,885	69.21%	2,542	29.90%	76	0.89%	3,343	39.32%	8,503
Fillmore	7,719	77.77%	2,143	21.59%	63	0.63%	5,576	56.18%	9,925
Freeborn	7,815	72.70%	2,859	26.60%	76	0.71%	4,956	46.10%	10,750
Goodhue	9,752	72.93%	3,520	26.32%	100	0.75%	6,232	46.60%	13,372
Grant	2,057	54.33%	1,687	44.56%	42	1.11%	370	9.77%	3,786
Hennepin	125,472	60.19%	80,851	38.79%	2,124	1.02%	44,621	21.41%	208,447
Houston	3,615	64.87%	1,937	34.76%	21	0.38%	1,678	30.11%	5,573
Hubbard	2,291	65.76%	1,120	32.15%	73	2.10%	1,171	33.61%	3,484
Isanti	3,137	71.13%	1,191	27.01%	82	1.86%	1,946	44.13%	4,410
Itasca	5,103	58.95%	3,122	36.07%	431	4.98%	1,981	22.89%	8,656
Jackson	3,099	55.06%	2,503	44.47%	26	0.46%	596	10.59%	5,628
Kanabec	2,380	68.35%	1,040	29.87%	62	1.78%	1,340	38.48%	3,482
Kandiyohi	5,780	67.82%	2,481	29.11%	261	3.06%	3,299	38.71%	8,522
Kittson	1,957	56.81%	1,383	40.15%	105	3.05%	574	16.66%	3,445
Koochiching	2,599	53.67%	2,110	43.57%	134	2.77%	489	10.10%	4,843
Lac qui Parle	3,406	59.65%	2,245	39.32%	59	1.03%	1,161	20.33%	5,710
Lake	2,014	72.84%	618	22.35%	133	4.81%	1,396	50.49%	2,765
Lake of the Woods	781	51.45%	681	44.86%	56	3.69%	100	6.59%	1,518
Le Sueur	3,401	42.23%	4,615	57.30%	38	0.47%	-1,214	-15.07%	8,054
Lincoln	1,952	48.20%	2,064	50.96%	34	0.84%	-112	-2.77%	4,050
Lyon	4,058	54.93%	3,274	44.32%	56	0.76%	784	10.61%	7,388
McLeod	4,252	54.82%	3,445	44.41%	60	0.77%	807	10.40%	7,757
Mahnomen	606	29.90%	1,378	67.98%	43	2.12%	-772	-38.09%	2,027
Marshall	3,738	61.58%	2,200	36.24%	132	2.17%	1,538	25.34%	6,070
Martin	5,110	64.10%	2,822	35.40%	40	0.50%	2,288	28.70%	7,972
Meeker	4,175	59.63%	2,761	39.43%	66	0.94%	1,414	20.19%	7,002
Mille Lacs	3,998	72.01%	1,436	25.86%	118	2.13%	2,562	46.15%	5,552
Morrison	3,846	42.18%	5,222	57.27%	51	0.56%	-1,376	-15.09%	9,119
Mower	6,209	63.09%	3,587	36.45%	46	0.47%	2,622	26.64%	9,842
Murray	2,602	55.26%	2,078	44.13%	29	0.62%	524	11.13%	4,709
Nicollet	3,628	59.13%	2,466	40.19%	42	0.68%	1,162	18.94%	6,136
Nobles	3,676	56.01%	2,862	43.61%	25	0.38%	814	12.40%	6,563
Norman	3,308	67.39%	1,401	28.54%	200	4.07%	1,907	38.85%	4,909
Olmsted	8,334	63.63%	4,720	36.04%	44	0.34%	3,614	27.59%	13,098
Otter Tail	11,624	68.28%	4,990	29.31%	411	2.41%	6,634	38.97%	17,025
Pennington	2,506	65.29%	1,198	31.21%	134	3.49%	1,308	34.08%	3,838
Pine	4,278	56.53%	3,185	42.09%	105	1.39%	1,093	14.44%	7,568
Pipestone	2,578	61.40%	1,591	37.89%	30	0.71%	987	23.51%	4,199
Polk	7,215	56.08%	5,357	41.64%	294	2.29%	1,858	14.44%	12,866
Pope	3,382	66.13%	1,667	32.60%	65	1.27%	1,715	33.54%	5,114
Ramsey	53,054	47.84%	56,807	51.22%	1,049	0.95%	-3,753	-3.38%	110,910
Red Lake	712	31.56%	1,507	66.80%	37	1.64%	-795	-35.24%	2,256
Redwood	5,111	63.18%	2,899	35.84%	79	0.98%	2,212	27.35%	8,089
Renville	5,107	57.18%	3,731	41.77%	94	1.05%	1,376	15.41%	8,932
Rice	6,576	56.50%	5,014	43.08%	49	0.42%	1,562	13.42%	11,639
Rock	2,433	60.03%	1,607	39.65%	13	0.32%	826	20.38%	4,053
Roseau	2,618	63.16%	1,342	32.38%	185	4.46%	1,276	30.78%	4,145
Saint Louis	44,331	61.13%	25,401	35.03%	2,785	3.84%	18,930	26.10%	72,517
Scott	1,732	28.11%	4,419	71.71%	11	0.18%	-2,687	-43.61%	6,162
Sherburne	2,437	69.08%	1,064	30.16%	27	0.77%	1,373	38.92%	3,528
Sibley	3,301	55.94%	2,553	43.26%	47	0.80%	748	12.68%	5,901
Stearns	6,459	28.56%	16,104	71.21%	52	0.23%	-9,645	-42.65%	22,615
Steele	4,744	62.46%	2,826	37.21%	25	0.33%	1,918	25.25%	7,595
Stevens	2,275	60.70%	1,457	38.87%	16	0.43%	818	21.82%	3,748
Swift	2,791	49.72%	2,733	48.69%	89	1.59%	58	1.03%	5,613
Todd	5,682	59.81%	3,733	39.29%	85	0.89%	1,949	20.52%	9,500
Traverse	1,214	38.79%	1,899	60.67%	17	0.54%	-685	-21.88%	3,130
Wabasha	3,944	55.84%	3,087	43.71%	32	0.45%	857	12.13%	7,063
Wadena	2,592	64.09%	1,343	33.21%	109	2.70%	1,249	30.89%	4,044
Waseca	3,251	56.94%	2,418	42.35%	41	0.72%	833	14.59%	5,710
Washington	6,113	59.06%	4,158	40.17%	80	0.77%	1,955	18.89%	10,351
Watonwan	3,306	69.69%	1,412	29.76%	26	0.55%	1,894	39.92%	4,744
Wilkin	1,874	53.90%	1,578	45.38%	25	0.72%	296	8.51%	3,477
Winona	7,459	53.16%	6,484	46.21%	88	0.63%	975	6.95%	14,031
Wright	6,011	56.57%	4,483	42.19%	132	1.24%	1,528	14.38%	10,626
Yellow Medicine	3,302	52.56%	2,861	45.54%	119	1.89%	441	7.02%	6,282
Totals	560,977	57.77%	396,458	40.83%	13,587	1.40%	164,519	16.94%	971,022

== See also ==
- United States presidential elections in Minnesota
