= Frankford Township =

Frankford Township may refer to:

- Frankford Township, New Jersey
- Frankford Township, Mower County, Minnesota
