= Varco, Minnesota =

- Unincorporated community
- Location within Minnesota Location within the United States
- Coordinates: 43°36′21″N 92°57′24″W
- Country: United States
- State: Minnesota
- County: Mower
- Township: Austin
- Elevation: 1,201 ft (366 m)
- Time zone: UTC-6 (Central (CST))
  - Summer (DST): UTC-5 (CDT)
- Area code: 507
- GNIS feature ID: 654983

Varco is an unincorporated community in Mower County, Minnesota, United States.

== History ==
Varco was platted in 1875, and named for Thomas Varco, the original owner of the town site. Thomas Varco was born in England and immigrated to Canada when he was four. He married Emaline Eddy, and in 1850 the two moved to Wisconsin. In 1856, they moved to Austin Township, Mower County, Minnesota, where Thomas lived on the same farm at Varco Station until his death. A post office was established at Varco in 1875, and remained in operation until 1882.
