= Bennington Township, Mower County, Minnesota =

Bennington Township, Minnesota
- Township
- Location within the state of Minnesota Bennington Township, Minnesota (the United States)
- Coordinates: 43°38′15″N 92°29′58″W
- Country: United States
- State: Minnesota
- County: Mower

Area
  - Total: 36.1 sq mi (93.6 km^{2})
  - Land: 36.1 sq mi (93.6 km^{2})
  - Water: 0 sq mi (0.0 km^{2})
- Elevation: 1,381 ft (421 m)

Population (2000)
  - Total: 178
  - Density: 4.9/sq mi (1.9/km^{2})
- Time zone: UTC-6 (Central (CST))
  - Summer (DST): UTC-5 (CDT)
- ZIP code: 55936
- Area code: 507
- FIPS code: 27-05176
- GNIS feature ID: 0663568

Bennington Township (formerly called Andover Township) is a township in Mower County, Minnesota, United States. The population was 178 at the 2000 census. All areas and population centers of the township are unincorporated areas. It was named for Bennington, Vermont, the site of a battle in the American Revolutionary War (the Battle of Bennington).

== History ==
A group of men from New York, who arrived in the spring of 1856, were the first settlers in Bennington Township. When Minnesota became a state in 1858, Bennington Township had not yet been organized. Therefore, until it was organized as a township in 1860, the northern part was included in Frankford Township and the southern part was part of Le Roy Township. The first township meeting was held in 1860 and the voters elected a chairman of the board, two supervisors, a justice of the peace and an assessor. Bennington and Clayton are still the least populated townships of the county with 178 people each.

== Geography ==
According to the United States Census Bureau, the township has a total area of 36.1 square miles (93 km^{2}), all land.

== Demographics ==
As of the census of 2000, there were 178 people, 64 households, and 54 families residing in the township. The population density was 4.9 inhabitants per square mile (1.9/km^{2}). There were 66 housing units at an average density of 1.8 per square mile (0.69/km^{2}). The racial makeup of the township was 99.44% White, and 0.56% from two or more races.

There were 64 households, out of which 32.8% had children under the age of 18 living with them, 71.9% were married couples living together, 9.4% had a female householder with no husband present, and 14.1% were non-families. 9.4% of all households were made up of individuals, and 1.6% had someone living alone who was 65 years of age or older. The average household size was 2.78 and the average family size was 3.00.

In the township the population was spread out, with 27.5% under the age of 18, 7.9% from 18 to 24, 31.5% from 25 to 44, 20.2% from 45 to 64, and 12.9% who were 65 years of age or older. The median age was 36 years. For every 100 females, there were 111.9 males. For every 100 females age 18 and over, there were 104.8 males.

The median income for a household in the township was $50,833, and the median income for a family was $52,083. Males had a median income of $40,250 versus $19,107 for females. The per capita income for the township was $24,386. About 5.1% of families and 8.4% of the population were below the poverty line, including 18.8% of those under the age of eighteen and none of those 65 or over.

== Cemetery ==
- Angell Cemetery is located in section 31 of the township.
