= Nevada Township, Mower County, Minnesota =

Nevada Township, Minnesota
- Township
- Location within the state of Minnesota Nevada Township, Minnesota (the United States)
- Coordinates: 43°32′24″N 92°52′27″W
- Country: United States
- State: Minnesota
- County: Mower

Area
  - Total: 36.8 sq mi (95.2 km^{2})
  - Land: 36.8 sq mi (95.2 km^{2})
  - Water: 0 sq mi (0.0 km^{2})
- Elevation: 1,217 ft (371 m)

Population (2000)
  - Total: 353
  - Density: 9.6/sq mi (3.7/km^{2})
- Time zone: UTC-6 (Central (CST))
  - Summer (DST): UTC-5 (CDT)
- ZIP codes: 55953, 55970
- Area code: 507
- FIPS code: 27-45322
- GNIS feature ID: 0665084

Nevada Township is a township in Mower County, Minnesota, United States. The population was 353 at the 2000 census.

== History ==
The first settlement in Nevada Township was by William Allen, a Massachusetts man, in the southwest quadrant of section 29, an area later called Six Mile Grove. This happened at some time before 1854, which is when he sold the land to Gunder Halverson and moved to Oregon. Sometime between that time and 1858, ten men settled in that same section and it was the first permanent settlement in the township. These men erected a mill in section 31 on Otter Creek, a tributary of the Cedar River. The mill was a little under a mile east of where Lyle now stands. The township was organized in 1858 and its name is derived from the California Sierra Nevada Mountains. Nevada Village was platted in section 2 and a mill was built on Otter Creek but there are no entries on the title record.

== Geography ==
According to the United States Census Bureau, the township has a total area of 36.7 square miles (95.2 km^{2}), all land.

== Demographics ==
As of the census of 2000, there were 353 people, 124 households, and 101 families residing in the township. The population density was 9.6 people per square mile (3.7/km^{2}). There were 139 housing units at an average density of 3.8/sq mi (1.5/km^{2}). The racial makeup of the township was 98.87% White, 0.28% Asian, 0.28% from other races, and 0.57% from two or more races. Hispanic or Latino of any race were 0.28% of the population.

There were 124 households, out of which 35.5% had children under the age of 18 living with them, 75.0% were married couples living together, 4.0% had a female householder with no husband present, and 18.5% were non-families. 15.3% of all households were made up of individuals, and 7.3% had someone living alone who was 65 years of age or older. The average household size was 2.85 and the average family size was 3.18.

In the township the population was spread out, with 30.3% under the age of 18, 6.2% from 18 to 24, 23.2% from 25 to 44, 28.0% from 45 to 64, and 12.2% who were 65 years of age or older. The median age was 40 years. For every 100 females, there were 115.2 males. For every 100 females age 18 and over, there were 105.0 males.

The median income for a household in the township was $41,071, and the median income for a family was $46,250. Males had a median income of $31,667 versus $23,750 for females. The per capita income for the township was $17,515. About 1.1% of families and 3.1% of the population were below the poverty line, including none of those under age 18 and 7.3% of those age 65 or over.

== Cemetery ==
- Six Mile Grove Cemetery is located on the north end of the southwest quadrant of section 33 of the township.
