= Robert Lyle (Minnesota politician) =

American politician

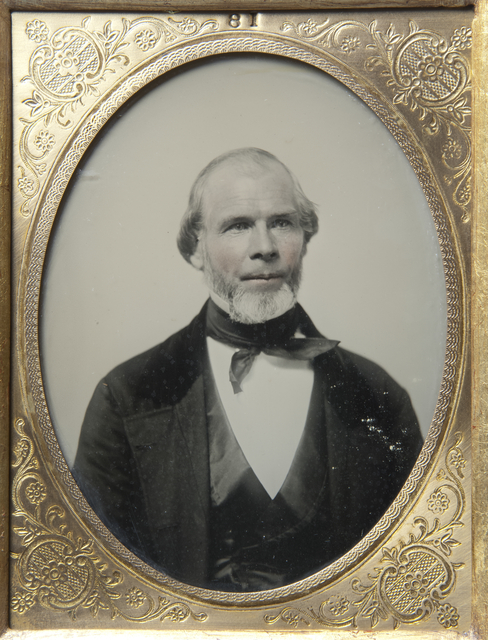
- Born: 29 February 1808; Washington County
- Died: 21 June 1896 (aged 88); Bates County
- Occupation: Politician, judge, postmaster
- Position held: member of the Minnesota House of Representatives

Robert Lyle (1808-1896) was an American politician, pioneer, and farmer.

Lyle moved to Minnesota Territory from Ohio in 1856. He served in the Minnesota State Constitutional Convention of 1857. In 1857, Lyle was elected to the first state Minnesota House of Representatives. Later, he served as Probate Judge for Mower County, Minnesota. In 1868, he moved to Missouri. The city of Lyle, Minnesota was named after him.
