= 1960 United States presidential election in Minnesota =

- November 8, 1960
- Turnout: 79.39% ▼

Nominee	John F. Kennedy	Richard Nixon
Party	Democratic (DFL)	Republican
Home state	Massachusetts	California
Running mate	Lyndon B. Johnson	Henry Cabot Lodge Jr.
Electoral vote	11	0
Popular vote	779,933	757,915
Percentage	50.58%	49.16%
County results
Kennedy
50–60%
60–70%
70–80%
Nixon
50–60%
60–70%
President before election
Dwight D. Eisenhower
Republican
Elected President
John F. Kennedy
Democratic

The 1960 United States presidential election in Minnesota took place on November 8, 1960, as part of the 1960 United States presidential election. Voters chose 11 electors, or representatives to the Electoral College, who voted for president and vice president.

Minnesota was won by the Democratic Party candidate U.S. Senator John F. Kennedy of Massachusetts won the state over incumbent Vice President Richard Nixon by a margin of 22,018 votes, or 1.42%. Kennedy went on to win the election nationally, but by the closest margin since James Garfield's 0.11% victory over Winfield Scott Hancock in 1880. This was the last presidential election held in Minnesota before the elimination of the 9th congressional district in 1963. It was also the last time Mower County voted for a Republican presidential candidate until Donald Trump in 2016. This marks the last time heavily populated Hennepin County voted for a candidate who lost the state as a whole. This election in the state would begin an ongoing streak of the state voting Democrat in every election starting with this one to the present day, with 1972 being the sole exception.

== Results ==
1960 United States presidential election in Minnesota
Party	Candidate	Votes	Percentage	Electoral votes
Democratic (DFL)	John F. Kennedy	779,933	50.58%	11
Republican	Richard Nixon	757,915	49.16%	0
Socialist Workers	Farrell Dobbs	3,077	0.20%	0
Industrial Government	Eric Hass	962	0.06%	0
Totals		1,541,887	100.00%	11
Voter turnout		79%		—

=== Results by county ===
County	John F. Kennedy DFL		Richard Nixon Republican		Farrell Dobbs Socialist Workers		Eric Hass Industrial Government		Margin		Total votes cast
County	#	%	#	%	#	%	#	%	#	%	Total votes cast
Aitkin	2,980	48.75%	3,097	50.66%	25	0.41%	11	0.18%	-117	-1.91%	6,113
Anoka	20,324	58.89%	14,114	40.90%	55	0.16%	18	0.05%	6,210	17.99%	34,511
Becker	5,257	50.60%	5,090	48.99%	33	0.32%	9	0.09%	167	1.61%	10,389
Beltrami	4,653	50.81%	4,482	48.95%	16	0.17%	6	0.07%	171	1.86%	9,157
Benton	4,175	55.56%	3,324	44.23%	14	0.19%	2	0.03%	851	11.33%	7,515
Big Stone	2,437	56.91%	1,834	42.83%	9	0.21%	2	0.05%	603	14.08%	4,282
Blue Earth	8,052	41.48%	11,328	58.35%	25	0.13%	8	0.04%	-3,276	-16.87%	19,413
Brown	5,353	42.99%	7,084	56.89%	13	0.10%	3	0.02%	-1,731	-13.90%	12,453
Carlton	7,576	61.98%	4,613	37.74%	30	0.25%	5	0.04%	2,963	24.24%	12,224
Carver	3,982	38.94%	6,231	60.93%	8	0.08%	6	0.06%	-2,249	-21.99%	10,227
Cass	3,578	44.78%	4,399	55.05%	12	0.15%	2	0.03%	-821	-10.27%	7,991
Chippewa	3,643	48.10%	3,915	51.69%	13	0.17%	3	0.04%	-272	-3.59%	7,574
Chisago	2,907	43.04%	3,822	56.59%	18	0.27%	7	0.10%	-915	-13.55%	6,754
Clay	7,241	46.58%	8,278	53.26%	19	0.12%	6	0.04%	-1,037	-6.68%	15,544
Clearwater	2,466	59.64%	1,651	39.93%	15	0.36%	3	0.07%	815	19.71%	4,135
Cook	650	39.61%	987	60.15%	4	0.24%	0	0.00%	-337	-20.54%	1,641
Cottonwood	2,768	35.16%	5,087	64.62%	11	0.14%	6	0.08%	-2,319	-29.46%	7,872
Crow Wing	6,835	46.77%	7,727	52.87%	41	0.28%	11	0.08%	-892	-6.10%	14,614
Dakota	20,150	57.13%	15,032	42.62%	72	0.20%	19	0.05%	5,118	14.51%	35,273
Dodge	2,170	36.51%	3,769	63.42%	3	0.05%	1	0.02%	-1,599	-26.91%	5,943
Douglas	4,871	46.36%	5,594	53.25%	32	0.30%	9	0.09%	-723	-6.89%	10,506
Faribault	4,301	38.11%	6,975	61.80%	8	0.07%	3	0.03%	-2,674	-23.69%	11,287
Fillmore	3,926	34.31%	7,507	65.60%	7	0.06%	4	0.03%	-3,581	-31.29%	11,444
Freeborn	8,018	47.14%	8,970	52.73%	13	0.08%	9	0.05%	-952	-5.59%	17,010
Goodhue	5,562	34.60%	10,473	65.16%	26	0.16%	12	0.07%	-4,911	-30.56%	16,073
Grant	2,333	50.98%	2,239	48.93%	4	0.09%	0	0.00%	94	2.05%	4,576
Hennepin	188,250	48.50%	198,992	51.26%	645	0.17%	294	0.08%	-10,742	-2.76%	388,181
Houston	3,080	39.04%	4,807	60.93%	3	0.04%	0	0.00%	-1,727	-21.89%	7,890
Hubbard	2,029	42.39%	2,749	57.43%	8	0.17%	1	0.02%	-720	-15.04%	4,787
Isanti	2,599	45.64%	3,067	53.86%	17	0.30%	11	0.19%	-468	-8.22%	5,694
Itasca	10,761	61.82%	6,615	38.00%	23	0.13%	9	0.05%	4,146	23.82%	17,408
Jackson	3,898	51.96%	3,591	47.87%	5	0.07%	8	0.11%	307	4.09%	7,502
Kanabec	1,890	45.08%	2,278	54.33%	20	0.48%	5	0.12%	-388	-9.25%	4,193
Kandiyohi	6,738	49.66%	6,786	50.02%	35	0.26%	8	0.06%	-48	-0.36%	13,567
Kittson	2,218	53.25%	1,937	46.51%	8	0.19%	2	0.05%	281	6.74%	4,165
Koochiching	4,578	59.80%	3,055	39.90%	22	0.29%	1	0.01%	1,523	19.90%	7,656
Lac qui Parle	3,253	50.44%	3,185	49.39%	9	0.14%	2	0.03%	68	1.05%	6,449
Lake	3,888	62.91%	2,276	36.83%	13	0.21%	3	0.05%	1,612	26.08%	6,180
Lake of the Woods	1,053	55.30%	835	43.86%	15	0.79%	1	0.05%	218	11.44%	1,904
Le Sueur	5,234	54.13%	4,426	45.77%	9	0.09%	1	0.01%	808	8.36%	9,670
Lincoln	2,500	53.68%	2,147	46.10%	7	0.15%	3	0.06%	353	7.58%	4,657
Lyon	5,550	53.86%	4,740	46.00%	13	0.13%	2	0.02%	810	7.86%	10,305
Mahnomen	1,864	67.81%	880	32.01%	4	0.15%	1	0.04%	984	35.80%	2,749
Marshall	3,759	55.47%	3,006	44.36%	6	0.09%	6	0.09%	753	11.11%	6,777
Martin	4,194	33.04%	8,479	66.81%	13	0.10%	6	0.05%	-4,285	-33.77%	12,692
McLeod	4,276	37.15%	7,214	62.67%	16	0.14%	5	0.04%	-2,938	-25.52%	11,511
Meeker	3,678	42.97%	4,857	56.74%	21	0.25%	4	0.05%	-1,179	-13.77%	8,560
Mille Lacs	2,886	42.25%	3,913	57.29%	22	0.32%	9	0.13%	-1,027	-15.04%	6,830
Morrison	7,337	62.37%	4,403	37.43%	17	0.14%	7	0.06%	2,934	24.94%	11,764
Mower	9,961	47.28%	11,040	52.40%	57	0.27%	10	0.05%	-1,079	-5.12%	21,068
Murray	3,009	47.19%	3,357	52.64%	6	0.09%	5	0.08%	-348	-5.45%	6,377
Nicollet	3,961	42.80%	5,283	57.08%	4	0.04%	7	0.08%	-1,322	-14.28%	9,255
Nobles	4,947	46.70%	5,636	53.20%	9	0.08%	2	0.02%	-689	-6.50%	10,594
Norman	2,932	52.49%	2,642	47.30%	5	0.09%	7	0.13%	290	5.19%	5,586
Olmsted	10,918	40.34%	16,080	59.41%	59	0.22%	8	0.03%	-5,162	-19.07%	27,065
Otter Tail	8,054	36.87%	13,747	62.94%	30	0.14%	12	0.05%	-5,693	-26.07%	21,843
Pennington	3,204	55.63%	2,537	44.05%	11	0.19%	7	0.12%	667	11.58%	5,759
Pine	4,211	54.78%	3,450	44.88%	18	0.23%	8	0.10%	761	9.90%	7,687
Pipestone	2,443	39.85%	3,677	59.97%	8	0.13%	3	0.05%	-1,234	-20.12%	6,131
Polk	9,346	55.27%	7,528	44.52%	26	0.15%	9	0.05%	1,818	10.75%	16,909
Pope	2,883	48.39%	3,062	51.39%	9	0.15%	4	0.07%	-179	-3.00%	5,958
Ramsey	108,464	58.15%	77,408	41.50%	557	0.30%	98	0.05%	31,056	16.65%	186,527
Red Lake	1,865	73.17%	679	26.64%	2	0.08%	3	0.12%	1,186	46.53%	2,549
Redwood	3,839	39.39%	5,893	60.47%	8	0.08%	6	0.06%	-2,054	-21.08%	9,746
Renville	4,958	45.67%	5,885	54.20%	11	0.10%	3	0.03%	-927	-8.53%	10,857
Rice	6,752	44.92%	8,248	54.87%	22	0.15%	9	0.06%	-1,496	-9.95%	15,031
Rock	1,823	34.42%	3,469	65.49%	2	0.04%	3	0.06%	-1,646	-31.07%	5,297
Roseau	3,198	58.34%	2,274	41.48%	8	0.15%	2	0.04%	924	16.86%	5,482
St. Louis	69,270	63.23%	39,620	36.17%	557	0.51%	98	0.09%	29,650	27.06%	109,545
Scott	6,061	62.21%	3,671	37.68%	7	0.07%	4	0.04%	2,390	24.53%	9,743
Sherburne	2,568	47.41%	2,837	52.37%	10	0.18%	2	0.04%	-269	-4.96%	5,417
Sibley	2,541	33.69%	4,987	66.12%	12	0.16%	2	0.03%	-2,446	-32.43%	7,542
Stearns	19,026	58.40%	13,522	41.50%	22	0.07%	11	0.03%	5,504	16.90%	32,581
Steele	4,491	39.74%	6,795	60.13%	14	0.12%	1	0.01%	-2,304	-20.39%	11,301
Stevens	2,405	46.92%	2,710	52.87%	6	0.12%	5	0.10%	-305	-5.95%	5,126
Swift	4,062	58.63%	2,848	41.11%	15	0.22%	3	0.04%	1,214	17.52%	6,928
Todd	5,051	48.88%	5,255	50.85%	21	0.20%	7	0.07%	-204	-1.97%	10,334
Traverse	2,122	59.11%	1,463	40.75%	4	0.11%	1	0.03%	659	18.36%	3,590
Wabasha	3,628	44.26%	4,566	55.70%	3	0.04%	0	0.00%	-938	-11.44%	8,197
Wadena	2,240	42.03%	3,082	57.83%	6	0.11%	1	0.02%	-842	-15.80%	5,329
Waseca	2,793	36.58%	4,838	63.36%	3	0.04%	2	0.03%	-2,045	-26.78%	7,636
Washington	11,870	51.31%	11,202	48.42%	46	0.20%	15	0.06%	668	2.89%	23,133
Watonwan	2,412	36.57%	4,173	63.28%	10	0.15%	0	0.00%	-1,761	-26.71%	6,595
Wilkin	2,319	49.69%	2,340	50.14%	7	0.15%	1	0.02%	-21	-0.45%	4,667
Winona	8,484	47.72%	9,271	52.14%	14	0.08%	11	0.06%	-787	-4.42%	17,780
Wright	6,452	47.24%	7,180	52.57%	19	0.14%	7	0.05%	-728	-5.33%	13,658
Yellow Medicine	3,649	48.82%	3,800	50.84%	22	0.29%	4	0.05%	-151	-2.02%	7,475
Totals	779,933	50.58%	757,915	49.16%	3,077	0.20%	962	0.06%	22,018	1.42%	1,541,887

==== Counties that flipped from Republican to Democratic ====
- Beltrami
- Benton
- Dakota
- Jackson
- Lac qui Parle
- Le Sueur
- Lyon
- Morrison
- Scott
- Stearns
- Washington

==== Counties that flipped from Democratic to Republican ====
- Isanti
- Kandiyohi

== See also ==
- United States presidential elections in Minnesota
