= Lyle Township, Mower County, Minnesota =

Lyle Township, Minnesota
- Township
- Location within the state of Minnesota Lyle Township, Minnesota (the United States)
- Coordinates: 43°32′27″N 92°59′30″W
- Country: United States
- State: Minnesota
- County: Mower

Area
  - Total: 35.5 sq mi (91.9 km^{2})
  - Land: 35.5 sq mi (91.9 km^{2})
  - Water: 0 sq mi (0.0 km^{2})
- Elevation: 1,188 ft (362 m)

Population (2000)
  - Total: 402
  - Density: 11/sq mi (4.4/km^{2})
- Time zone: UTC-6 (Central (CST))
  - Summer (DST): UTC-5 (CDT)
- ZIP code: 55953
- Area code: 507
- FIPS code: 27-38672
- GNIS feature ID: 0664844

Lyle Township is a township in Mower County, Minnesota, United States. The population was 402 at the 2000 census. The largest city contained within the township is Lyle with 566 people. All other areas of the township are unincorporated. The township was named for Robert Lyle, an early settler from Ohio who later went on to become judge of probate and an elected representative of the region in the Minnesota House of Representatives.

== History ==
J.D. Woodbury built a log cabin along the Cedar River in section 33 (about two and a half miles west of the modern-day town of Lyle) in 1853 which he then sold to Benjamin Coe in 1855 before moving to Olmsted County. Section 4 started to be settled in 1854 by Eben Merry as well as by James Foster and his son, Return. John Tift also came in 1854 and started the small settlement of Troy. The township was officially organized in 1858 and it was later named for Robert Lyle, an early settler from Ohio. He came to the area in 1856 and went on to become judge of probate and an elected representative of the region in the Minnesota House of Representatives. He stayed in the area until 1868 when he moved to Missouri.

== Geography ==
According to the United States Census Bureau, the township has a total area of 35.5 square miles (92 km^{2}), all land.

== Demographics ==
As of the census of 2000, there were 402 people, 146 households, and 113 families residing in the township. The population density was 11.3 inhabitants per square mile (4.4/km^{2}). There were 157 housing units at an average density of 4.4 per square mile (1.7/km^{2}). The racial makeup of the township was 99.00% White, 0.25% Native American, 0.25% Asian, and 0.50% from two or more races.

There were 146 households, out of which 34.2% had children under the age of 18 living with them, 71.2% were married couples living together, 2.7% had a female householder with no husband present, and 22.6% were non-families. 17.1% of all households were made up of individuals, and 5.5% had someone living alone who was 65 years of age or older. The average household size was 2.75 and the average family size was 3.12.

In the township the population was spread out, with 23.9% under the age of 18, 11.4% from 18 to 24, 27.4% from 25 to 44, 27.1% from 45 to 64, and 10.2% who were 65 years of age or older. The median age was 38 years. For every 100 females, there were 119.7 males. For every 100 females age 18 and over, there were 120.1 males.

The median income for a household in the township was $46,667, and the median income for a family was $46,500. Males had a median income of $30,000 versus $24,444 for females. The per capita income for the township was $19,116. About 6.6% of families and 8.4% of the population were below the poverty line, including 6.6% of those under age 18 and none of those age 65 or over.

== Communities ==
=== Troy ===
The old town of Troy was on the Cedar River in sections 4 and 8, about eight miles (13 km) south of Austin. It was settled on March 24, 1857, by John Tift and it once had a dam, sawmill, grist mill and a hotel. It suffered the same fate as Cedar City in the spring of 1858.

=== Cedar City ===
John Chandler came to Lyle Township from Milton, Ontario, in 1856 and took up a claim in section 4. He later gave up his rights to his claim in favor of Caleb Stock and John Phelps. These two men, along with T.N. Stone, built a dam of stones and timber and then built a sawmill and grist mill behind it. The rains of the spring of 1858 were unusually heavy and the new dam gave way to the unexpected water levels. The dam and mills were never rebuilt, but some of the old residents of the short-lived settlement lie in rest at nearby Cedar City Cemetery.

== Cemetery ==
- Woodbury Cemetery is located in the far northwest corner of the southwest quadrant of section 33 of the township near the Cedar River. It was established by J.W. Woodbury at some time before 1855 and the south section contains some Civil War soldiers.
