= Pleasant Valley Township, Mower County, Minnesota =

Pleasant Valley Township, Minnesota
- Township
- Location within the state of Minnesota Pleasant Valley Township, Minnesota (the United States)
- Coordinates: 43°48′4″N 92°37′13″W
- Country: United States
- State: Minnesota
- County: Mower

Area
  - Total: 30.1 sq mi (78.0 km^{2})
  - Land: 30.1 sq mi (78.0 km^{2})
  - Water: 0 sq mi (0.0 km^{2})
- Elevation: 1,322 ft (403 m)

Population (2000)
  - Total: 308
  - Density: 10/sq mi (3.9/km^{2})
- Time zone: UTC-6 (Central (CST))
  - Summer (DST): UTC-5 (CDT)
- FIPS code: 27-51640
- GNIS feature ID: 0665324

Pleasant Valley Township is a township in Mower County, Minnesota, United States. The population was 308 at the 2000 census. There are no recognized cities or towns and the township is entirely an unincorporated area.

== History ==
The township was named for Pleasant Valley, New York by its first settler, Sylvester Hills. He came with his son, Byron, in 1854 and brought the rest of his family in 1855. Robert Reed, Russell Hoag and Robert Rowley came in 1857 and Rowley set up a hotel in the Winona wheat route. The township was officially organized in 1858.

In 1933 Pleasant Valley Township resident A.E. Hoover, a first cousin of then-President Herbert Hoover traveled with two other farmers to Des Moines, Iowa (about 200 miles away) to secure a compromise on the foreclosure of his farm. He had missed one $400 semi-annual payment and was faced with eviction. He secured a compromise which allowed him to stay on his farm as a renter. Hoover, like the ex-president, was born in West Branch, Iowa.

== Geography ==
According to the United States Census Bureau, the township has a total area of 30.1 square miles (78.0 km^{2}), all land.

== Demographics ==
As of the census of 2000, there were 308 people, 100 households, and 75 families residing in the township. The population density was 10.2 people per square mile (3.9/km^{2}). There were 104 housing units at an average density of 3.5/sq mi (1.3/km^{2}). The racial makeup of the township was 97.40% White, and 2.60% from two or more races. Hispanic or Latino of any race were 0.65% of the population.

There were 100 households, out of which 43.0% had children under the age of 18 living with them, 70.0% were married couples living together, 2.0% had a female householder with no husband present, and 25.0% were non-families. 19.0% of all households were made up of individuals, and 8.0% had someone living alone who was 65 years of age or older. The average household size was 3.08 and the average family size was 3.67.

In the township the population was spread out, with 38.3% under the age of 18, 4.2% from 18 to 24, 29.5% from 25 to 44, 18.8% from 45 to 64, and 9.1% who were 65 years of age or older. The median age was 32 years. For every 100 females, there were 100.0 males. For every 100 females age 18 and over, there were 106.5 males.

The median income for a household in the township was $46,250, and the median income for a family was $48,750. Males had a median income of $35,865 versus $20,313 for females. The per capita income for the township was $14,242. About 2.6% of families and 3.0% of the population were below the poverty line, including 4.3% of those under the age of eighteen and none of those 65 or over.
