= Clayton Township, Mower County, Minnesota =

Township in Mower County

Clayton Township, Minnesota
- Township
- Location within the state of Minnesota
- Coordinates: 43°37′23″N 92°38′21″W
- Country: United States
- State: Minnesota
- County: Mower

Area
  - Total: 36.11 sq mi (93.52 km^{2})
  - Land: 36.11 sq mi (93.52 km^{2})
  - Water: 0 sq mi (0.0 km^{2})
- Elevation: 1,421 ft (433 m)

Population (2010)
  - Total: 158
  - Density: 4.4/sq mi (1.68/km^{2})
- Time zone: UTC-6 (Central (CST))
  - Summer (DST): UTC-5 (CDT)
- FIPS code: 27-11728
- GNIS feature ID: 0663812

Clayton Township (formerly Providence Township) is a township in Mower County, Minnesota, United States. The population was 178 at the 2000 census. All areas and population centers in the township are unincorporated areas. It was organized in June 1873 and was named for William Z. Clayton, who owned a large tract of land there at the time.

== History ==
A native of Maine, William Z. Clayton lived in Winona, Minnesota and summered in Clayton Township. When Mower County was organized, Clayton was one of the townships which did not have enough settlers to be organized and thus much of the township was sold to speculators. By 1870, much of the land had been bought from the speculators, but crop failures in those early years resulted in many foreclosures and much of the land returned again to speculators. Clayton and Bennington are still the least populated townships of the county with 178 people each.

== Geography ==
According to the United States Census Bureau, the township has a total area of 36.2 square miles (94 km^{2}), all land.

== Demographics ==
At the 2010 census, there were 158 people, 56 households and 47 families residing in the township. The population density was 4.9 per square mile (1.9/km^{2}). There were 68 housing units at an average density of 1.9/sq mi (0.72/km^{2}). The racial makeup of the township was 97.75% White, 1.12% from other races, and 1.12% from two or more races. Hispanic or Latino of any race were 1.12% of the population.

There were 56 households, of which 41.1% had children under the age of 18 living with them, 78.6% were married couples living together, and 14.3% were non-families. 14.3% of all households were made up of individuals, and 5.4% had someone living alone who was 65 years of age or older. The average household size was 3.18 and the average family size was 3.54.

33.7% of the population were under the age of 18, 10.1% from 18 to 24, 23.0% from 25 to 44, 23.6% from 45 to 64, and 9.6% who were 65 years of age or older. The median age was 35 years. For every 100 females, there were 102.3 males. For every 100 females age 18 and over, there were 122.6 males.

The median household income was $75,739 and the median family income was $80,000. Males had a median income of $32,708 and females $35,833. The per capita income was $32,453. About 2.1% of families and 5.2% of the population were below the poverty line, including 6.2% of those under the age of eighteen and none of those 65 or over.

== Cemetery ==
- Marshall Lutheran Cemetery is located in the township. Its oldest known burial dates to 1877.
