= Mower County, Minnesota =

County in Minnesota, United States

- County
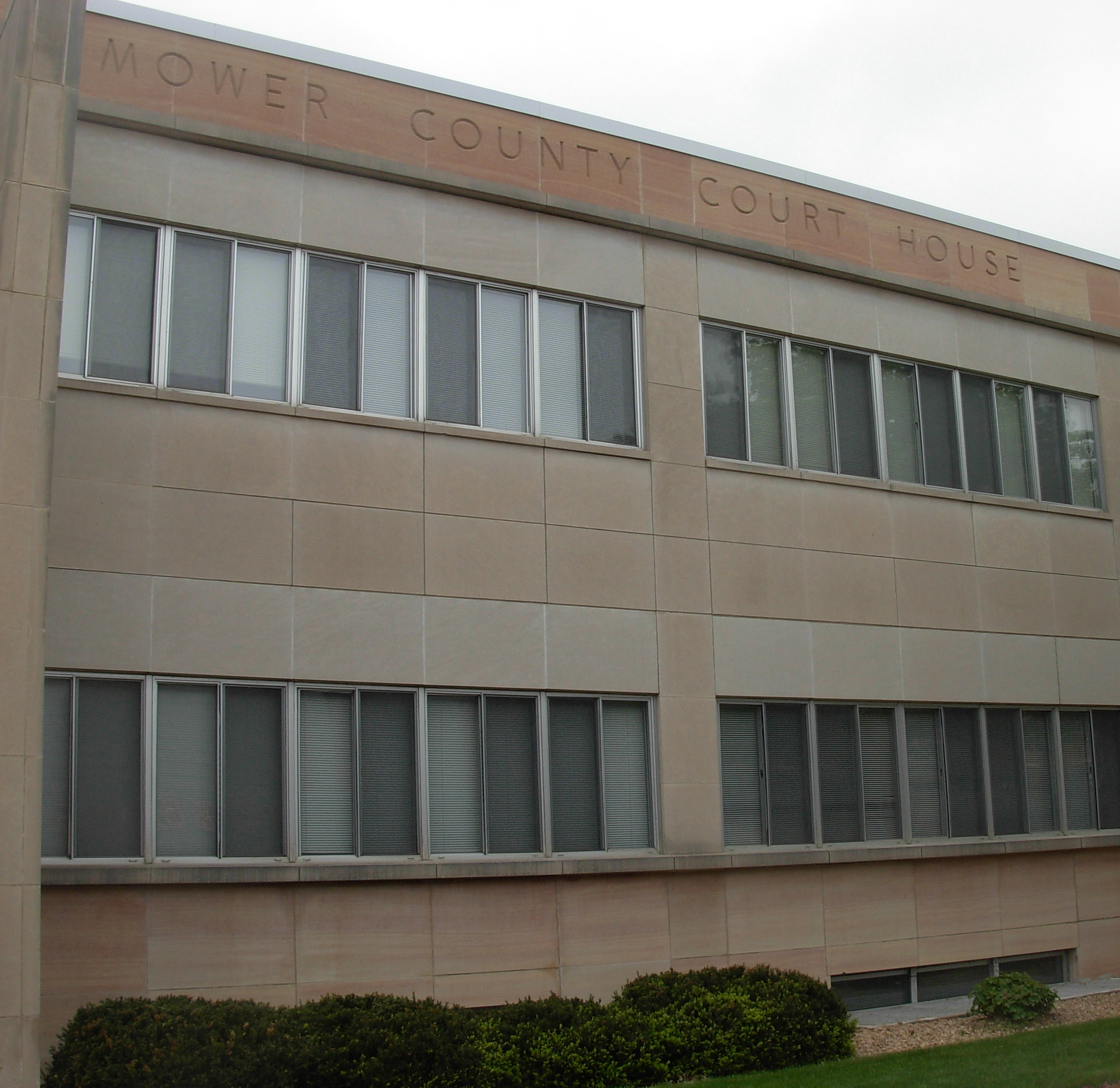
- Mower County Courthouse in Austin

- Location within the U.S. state of Minnesota
- Coordinates: 43°40′N 92°45′W
- Country: United States
- State: Minnesota
- Founded: February 20, 1855 (created); March 1, 1856 (organized)
- Named for: John Edward Mower
- Seat: Austin
- Largest city: Austin

Area
  - Total: 711.5 sq mi (1,843 km^{2})
  - Land: 711.3 sq mi (1,842 km^{2})
  - Water: 0.2 sq mi (0.52 km^{2}) 0.03%

Population (2020)
  - Total: 40,029
  - Estimate (2025): 40,971 ▲
  - Density: 57.6/sq mi (22.2/km^{2})
- Time zone: UTC−6 (Central)
  - Summer (DST): UTC−5 (CDT)
- Congressional district: 1st
- Website: www.co.mower.mn.us

Mower County (/ˈmaʊ.ər/) is a county in the U.S. state of Minnesota. As of the 2020 census, the population was 40,029. The county seat is Austin. Mower County comprises the Austin Micropolitan Statistical Area and is included in the Rochester-Austin Combined Statistical Area. Lake Louise State Park is in southeastern Mower County, near Le Roy.

== History ==
The federal government established Wisconsin Territory effective July 3, 1836, and included what is now Minnesota, until its eastern portion was granted statehood (as Wisconsin) in 1848.

Congress established the Minnesota Territory effective March 3, 1849. The newly organized territorial legislature created nine counties across the territory in October of that year. Two of the original counties, Dakota and Wabashaw (later Wabasha), had portions reassigned on March 5, 1853, to create Rice County.

In 1852, Jacob McQuillin's family settled in southern Rice County, beginning a settlement movement that rapidly grew. On February 20, 1855, the territorial legislature created the present county from the southernmost part of Rice County. The new county was named for John Edward Mower, a member of the territorial legislature.

On March 1, 1856, Territorial Governor Willis A. Gorman signed the legislative act that organized the county. He appointed three commissioners, who first met in Frankford Township. In January 1857 those commissioners designated the permanent seat in Austin Township. In July 1857 the location within Austin Township was further defined, within Austin village, which had been platted during the spring of 1856.

== Geography ==
Soils of Mower County

Mower County lies on Minnesota's border with Iowa. The Cedar River flows south through the western part of the county, into Mitchell County, Iowa. The Upper Iowa River rises in Mower County. Its branches, the Little Iowa and Upper Branch Upper Iowa, merge near Le Roy and flow east-southeast out of the county's southeast corner into Mitchell County, Iowa. Deer Creek drains the southeastern part of the county, flowing northeast into Fillmore County. Bear Creek drains the northern part of the county, flowing east into Fillmore County. Carey Creek drains the northeastern part of the county, flowing northeast into Olmsted County. The county terrain consists of low rolling hills, etched with drainages and gullies. The area is devoted to agriculture where possible. The terrain slopes to the east and south from an elevated center ridge running west–east, with its highest point 1.6 miles (2.6 km) east of Elkton, at 1,440 ft (440 m) ASL. The county has an area of 712 square miles (1,840 km^{2}), of which 711 square miles (1,840 km^{2}) is land and 0.2 square miles (0.52 km^{2}) (0.03%) is water.

=== Lakes ===
One of only four counties in Minnesota without any natural lakes (along with Olmsted, Pipestone, and Rock), Mower County does have four small ponds and lakes created by dams:

- East Side Lake: in the northeast quadrant of Austin
- Lake Louise: in Lake Louise State Park near Le Roy
- Mill Pond: in downtown Austin near the Hormel plant
- Ramsey Mill Pond: in Ramsey Golf Course, near the unincorporated settlement of Ramsey

The Cedar River (sometimes called the Red Cedar River) flows south into the county from its source in Dodge County and continues through the county into Mitchell County, Iowa. It flows through Mower County's four westernmost townships: Udolpho, Lansing, Austin, and Lyle.

=== Transit ===
- Southern Minnesota Area Rural Transit

=== Major highways ===
- I-90
- I-90 BL
- US 63
- US 218
- Minnesota State Highway 16
- Minnesota State Highway 56
- Minnesota State Highway 105
- Minnesota State Highway 251

=== Airports ===
- Austin Municipal Airport (AUM) - east of Austin

=== Adjacent counties ===
- Dodge County - north
- Olmsted County - northeast
- Fillmore County - east
- Howard County, Iowa - southeast
- Mitchell County, Iowa - south
- Worth County, Iowa - southwest
- Freeborn County - west
- Steele County - northwest

=== Protected areas ===
- Lake Louise State Park
- Larson State Wildlife Management Area
- Red Cedar State Wildlife Management Area
- Rose State Wildlife Management Area

== Demographics ==
Historical population
| Census | Pop. | Note | %± |
|---|---|---|---|
| 1860 | 3,217 | | — |
| 1870 | 10,447 | | 224.7% |
| 1880 | 16,799 | | 60.8% |
| 1890 | 18,019 | | 7.3% |
| 1900 | 22,335 | | 24.0% |
| 1910 | 22,640 | | 1.4% |
| 1920 | 25,993 | | 14.8% |
| 1930 | 28,065 | | 8.0% |
| 1940 | 36,113 | | 28.7% |
| 1950 | 42,277 | | 17.1% |
| 1960 | 48,498 | | 14.7% |
| 1970 | 44,919 | | −7.4% |
| 1980 | 40,390 | | −10.1% |
| 1990 | 37,385 | | −7.4% |
| 2000 | 38,603 | | 3.3% |
| 2010 | 39,163 | | 1.5% |
| 2020 | 40,029 | | 2.2% |
| 2025 (est.) | 40,971 | ▲ | 2.4% |
U.S. Decennial Census:

The county population has declined since its peak in 1960, as younger people have moved to urban areas for economic opportunities.

=== Racial and ethnic composition ===
Mower County, Minnesota – Racial and ethnic composition Note: the US Census treats Hispanic/Latino as an ethnic category. This table excludes Latinos from the racial categories and assigns them to a separate category. Hispanics/Latinos may be of any race.
| Race / Ethnicity (NH = Non-Hispanic) | Pop 1980 | Pop 1990 | Pop 2000 | Pop 2010 | Pop 2020 | % 1980 | % 1990 | % 2000 | % 2010 | % 2020 |
|---|---|---|---|---|---|---|---|---|---|---|
| White alone (NH) | 39,969 | 36,728 | 35,884 | 32,975 | 29,804 | 98.96% | 98.24% | 92.96% | 84.20% | 74.46% |
| Black or African American alone (NH) | 36 | 67 | 206 | 791 | 1,613 | 0.09% | 0.18% | 0.53% | 2.02% | 4.03% |
| Native American or Alaska Native alone (NH) | 26 | 50 | 51 | 62 | 57 | 0.06% | 0.13% | 0.13% | 0.16% | 0.14% |
| Asian alone (NH) | 120 | 290 | 564 | 636 | 2,052 | 0.30% | 0.78% | 1.46% | 1.62% | 5.13% |
| Native Hawaiian or Pacific Islander alone (NH) | x | x | 2 | 36 | 255 | x | x | 0.01% | 0.09% | 0.64% |
| Other race alone (NH) | 60 | 2 | 24 | 30 | 123 | 0.15% | 0.01% | 0.06% | 0.08% | 0.31% |
| Mixed race or Multiracial (NH) | x | x | 226 | 495 | 1,044 | x | x | 0.59% | 1.26% | 2.61% |
| Hispanic or Latino (any race) | 179 | 248 | 1,646 | 4,138 | 5,081 | 0.44% | 0.66% | 4.26% | 10.57% | 12.69% |
| Total | 40,390 | 37,385 | 38,603 | 39,163 | 40,029 | 100.00% | 100.00% | 100.00% | 100.00% | 100.00% |

=== 2020 census ===
As of the 2020 census, the county had a population of 40,029. The median age was 38.5 years. 25.5% of residents were under the age of 18 and 18.5% of residents were 65 years of age or older. For every 100 females there were 99.3 males, and for every 100 females age 18 and over there were 98.6 males age 18 and over.

The racial makeup of the county was 77.0% White, 4.1% Black or African American, 0.5% American Indian and Alaska Native, 5.2% Asian, 0.6% Native Hawaiian and Pacific Islander, 6.3% from some other race, and 6.4% from two or more races. Hispanic or Latino residents of any race comprised 12.7% of the population.

63.7% of residents lived in urban areas, while 36.3% lived in rural areas.

There were 15,700 households in the county, of which 31.1% had children under the age of 18 living in them. Of all households, 48.3% were married-couple households, 19.1% were households with a male householder and no spouse or partner present, and 24.1% were households with a female householder and no spouse or partner present. About 29.2% of all households were made up of individuals and 13.5% had someone living alone who was 65 years of age or older.

There were 16,928 housing units, of which 7.3% were vacant. Among occupied housing units, 73.6% were owner-occupied and 26.4% were renter-occupied. The homeowner vacancy rate was 1.4% and the rental vacancy rate was 7.9%.

=== 2000 census ===
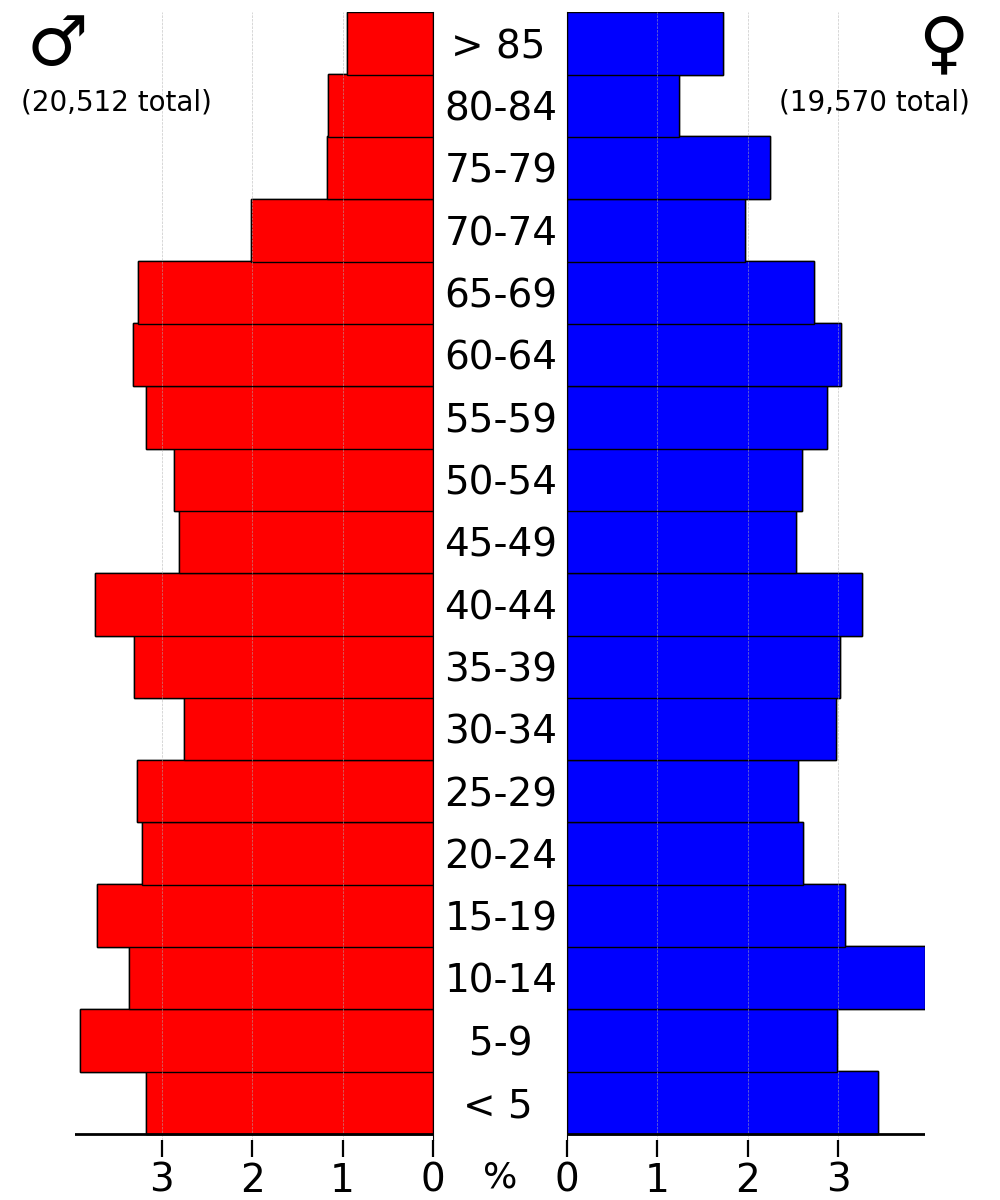
2022 US Census population pyramid for Mower County, from ACS 5-year estimates

As of the census of 2000, there were 38,603 people, 15,582 households, and 10,315 families in the county. The population density was 54.3 per square mile (21.0/km^{2}). There were 16,251 housing units at an average density of 22.9 per square mile (8.8/km^{2}). The racial makeup of the county was 94.7% White, 0.6% Black or African American, 0.2% Native American, 1.5% Asian, <0.1% Pacific Islander, 2.2% from other races, and 0.9% from two or more races. 4.3% of the population were Hispanic or Latino of any race. 35.9% identified as being of German, 24.4% as Norwegian and 7.0% as of Irish ancestry.

There were 15,582 households, out of which 29.70% had children under the age of 18 living with them, 54.70% were married couples living together, 8.00% had a female householder with no husband present, and 33.80% were non-families. 29.10% of all households were made up of individuals, and 14.80% had someone living alone who was 65 years of age or older. The average household size was 2.42 and the average family size was 2.98.

The county population contained 25.1% under the age of 18, 8.2% from 18 to 24, 25.7% from 25 to 44, 21.4% from 45 to 64, and 19.6% who were 65 years of age or older. The median age was 39 years. For every 100 females there were 97.00 males. For every 100 females age 18 and over, there were 93.60 males.

The median income for a household in the county was $36,654, and the median income for a family was $45,154. Males had a median income of $31,743 versus $23,317 for females. The per capita income for the county was $19,795. About 6.3% of families and 9.2% of the population were below the poverty line, including 11.3% of those under age 18 and 5.6% of those age 65 or over.

== Government ==
Mower County has a county-council style of government, made up of five county commissioners, each elected from a single-member district. They are elected to four-year terms, and elected on a staggered basis.

- First district cities: Brownsdale, Mapleview, Waltham and the 1st ward, 1st precinct of Austin
  - Townships: Lansing Township, Red Rock Township, Udolpho Township, Waltham Township
    - Commissioner: John Mueller
- Second district cities: Adams, Dexter, Elkton, Grand Meadow, Le Roy, Racine, Sargeant, Taopi
  - Townships: Adams Township, Bennington Township, Clayton Township, Dexter Township, Frankford Township, Grand Meadow Township, Le Roy Township, Lodi Township, Marshall Township, Pleasant Valley Township, Racine Township, Sargeant Township
    - Commissioner: Polly Glynn
- Third district cities: Lyle, Rose Creek and the 2nd ward, 2nd precinct of Austin.
  - Townships: Austin, Lyle, Nevada and Windom.
    - Commissioner: Jerry Reinartz
- Fourth district: all of the 3rd ward of Austin.
  - Commissioner: Dan Sparks
- Fifth district: the 1st ward, 2nd precinct and the 2nd ward, 1st precinct of Austin.
  - Commissioner: Mike Ankeny

From its first participating election in 1860 through 1928, Mower County was traditionally Republican, voting for the Republican nominee in every election save 1912, when it voted for Bull Moose nominee and former Republican president Theodore Roosevelt. After the New Deal realignment in 1932, Mower County leaned Democratic for about 80 years, voting for the Democrat in every presidential election through 2012 save in Eisenhower's two landslides (1952 and 1956), and 1960, when it voted for Nixon over Kennedy (despite having only narrowly voted for Eisenhower four years earlier). In 2016, Donald Trump became the first Republican to carry the county since 1960, winning a high plurality of 49.8%. In 2020, he carried it again, this time with a majority, making it the first time the county had voted Republican two elections in a row since 1956 and 1960. In 2024, Trump increased his vote share again, winning the county by double digits and having the best performance for a Republican since 1928.

State Legislature (2025-2027)
| Position | Name | Affiliation | District |
|---|---|---|---|
| Senate | Gene Dornink | Republican | District 23 |
| House of Representatives | Peggy Bennett | Republican | District 23A |
| House of Representatives | Patricia Mueller | Republican | District 23B |

U.S Congress (2025-2027)
| Position | Name | Affiliation | District |
|---|---|---|---|
| House of Representatives | Brad Finstad | Republican | 1st |
| Senate | Amy Klobuchar | Democrat | N/A |
| Senate | Tina Smith | Democrat | N/A |

United States presidential election results for Mower County, Minnesota
| Year | Republican | | Democratic | | Third party(ies) | |
| Year | No. | % | No. | % | No. | % |
|---|---|---|---|---|---|---|
| 1892 | 2,234 | 56.36% | 1,310 | 33.05% | 420 | 10.60% |
| 1896 | 3,379 | 68.83% | 1,407 | 28.66% | 123 | 2.51% |
| 1900 | 3,076 | 70.75% | 1,081 | 24.86% | 191 | 4.39% |
| 1904 | 2,769 | 77.50% | 552 | 15.45% | 252 | 7.05% |
| 1908 | 2,629 | 63.46% | 1,206 | 29.11% | 308 | 7.43% |
| 1912 | 1,321 | 31.63% | 1,228 | 29.40% | 1,628 | 38.98% |
| 1916 | 2,520 | 59.43% | 1,572 | 37.08% | 148 | 3.49% |
| 1920 | 6,339 | 82.06% | 1,061 | 13.73% | 325 | 4.21% |
| 1924 | 5,061 | 55.69% | 564 | 6.21% | 3,463 | 38.11% |
| 1928 | 6,209 | 63.09% | 3,587 | 36.45% | 46 | 0.47% |
| 1932 | 4,005 | 37.79% | 6,421 | 60.58% | 173 | 1.63% |
| 1936 | 4,743 | 35.17% | 8,228 | 61.01% | 516 | 3.83% |
| 1940 | 7,169 | 47.11% | 7,988 | 52.49% | 60 | 0.39% |
| 1944 | 6,588 | 47.62% | 7,199 | 52.03% | 48 | 0.35% |
| 1948 | 5,672 | 37.07% | 9,468 | 61.88% | 161 | 1.05% |
| 1952 | 9,862 | 53.16% | 8,551 | 46.09% | 138 | 0.74% |
| 1956 | 9,570 | 50.66% | 9,219 | 48.80% | 101 | 0.53% |
| 1960 | 11,040 | 52.40% | 9,961 | 47.28% | 67 | 0.32% |
| 1964 | 6,510 | 32.32% | 13,573 | 67.39% | 57 | 0.28% |
| 1968 | 7,736 | 39.70% | 11,022 | 56.56% | 728 | 3.74% |
| 1972 | 9,929 | 48.36% | 10,286 | 50.10% | 315 | 1.53% |
| 1976 | 8,163 | 37.99% | 12,837 | 59.74% | 487 | 2.27% |
| 1980 | 7,908 | 38.91% | 10,538 | 51.85% | 1,879 | 9.24% |
| 1984 | 8,054 | 39.01% | 12,498 | 60.53% | 95 | 0.46% |
| 1988 | 6,969 | 36.63% | 11,893 | 62.51% | 163 | 0.86% |
| 1992 | 5,147 | 25.47% | 9,935 | 49.16% | 5,128 | 25.37% |
| 1996 | 4,994 | 27.65% | 10,413 | 57.65% | 2,656 | 14.70% |
| 2000 | 6,873 | 37.19% | 10,693 | 57.86% | 914 | 4.95% |
| 2004 | 7,591 | 37.54% | 12,334 | 60.99% | 297 | 1.47% |
| 2008 | 7,075 | 36.87% | 11,605 | 60.48% | 507 | 2.64% |
| 2012 | 6,938 | 37.42% | 11,129 | 60.03% | 472 | 2.55% |
| 2016 | 8,823 | 49.81% | 7,437 | 41.98% | 1,455 | 8.21% |
| 2020 | 10,025 | 51.82% | 8,899 | 46.00% | 421 | 2.18% |
| 2024 | 10,297 | 54.28% | 8,312 | 43.82% | 360 | 1.90% |

== Communities ==
=== Cities ===
- Adams
- Austin (county seat)
- Brownsdale
- Dexter
- Elkton
- Grand Meadow
- Le Roy
- Lyle
- Mapleview
- Racine
- Rose Creek
- Sargeant
- Taopi
- Waltham

=== Census-designated place ===
- Lansing

=== Unincorporated communities ===
- Andyville
- Corning (part)
- Johnsburg
- Mayville
- Nicolville
- Ramsey
- Renova
- Varco

=== Townships ===
Mower County's land is divided into 20 townships that each contain 36 square miles (six miles on a side). Mower County is five townships wide (30 miles (48 km) west to east) and four townships from north to south (24 miles).

- Adams
- Austin
- Bennington
- Clayton
- Dexter
- Frankford
- Grand Meadow
- Lansing
- Le Roy
- Lodi
- Lyle
- Marshall
- Nevada
- Pleasant Valley
- Racine
- Red Rock
- Sargeant
- Udolpho
- Waltham
- Windom

== See also ==
- National Register of Historic Places listings in Mower County, Minnesota
