= Udolpho Township, Mower County, Minnesota =

Udolpho Township, Minnesota
- Township
- Location within the state of Minnesota Udolpho Township, Minnesota (the United States)
- Coordinates: 43°48′16″N 92°59′15″W
- Country: United States
- State: Minnesota
- County: Mower

Area
  - Total: 36.0 sq mi (93.3 km^{2})
  - Land: 36.0 sq mi (93.3 km^{2})
  - Water: 0 sq mi (0.0 km^{2})
- Elevation: 1,237 ft (377 m)

Population (2000)
  - Total: 458
  - Density: 13/sq mi (4.9/km^{2})
- Time zone: UTC-6 (Central (CST))
  - Summer (DST): UTC-5 (CDT)
- FIPS code: 27-66118
- GNIS feature ID: 0665834

Udolpho Township is a township in Mower County, Minnesota, United States. The population was 458 at the 2000 census. There are no recognized cities or towns and the whole township is an unincorporated area. Blooming Prairie is only about a quarter of a mile away in Steele County to the north. The township's name is taken from a gothic novel titled The Mysteries of Udolpho by the English author Ann Radcliffe.

== History ==
Udolpho Township was organized in 1858, and named after the novel The Mysteries of Udolpho by Ann Radcliffe.

== Geography ==
According to the United States Census Bureau, the township has a total area of 36.0 square miles (93.3 km^{2}), all land.

== Demographics ==
As of the census of 2000, there were 458 people, 163 households, and 139 families residing in the township. The population density was 12.7 people per square mile (4.9/km^{2}). There were 173 housing units at an average density of 4.8/sq mi (1.9/km^{2}). The racial makeup of the township was 98.25% White, 0.87% African American, 0.87% from other races. Hispanic or Latino of any race were 1.31% of the population.

There were 163 households, out of which 37.4% had children under the age of 18 living with them, 76.1% were married couples living together, 3.7% had a female householder with no husband present, and 14.7% were non-families. 12.3% of all households were made up of individuals, and 6.7% had someone living alone who was 65 years of age or older. The average household size was 2.81 and the average family size was 3.06.

In the township the population was spread out, with 27.9% under the age of 18, 6.3% from 18 to 24, 26.2% from 25 to 44, 22.7% from 45 to 64, and 16.8% who were 65 years of age or older. The median age was 39 years. For every 100 females, there were 116.0 males. For every 100 females age 18 and over, there were 103.7 males.

The median income for a household in the township was $40,179, and the median income for a family was $41,964. Males had a median income of $33,125 versus $20,781 for females. The per capita income for the township was $19,140. About 5.0% of families and 8.9% of the population were below the poverty line, including 15.0% of those under age 18 and 4.8% of those age 65 or over.

== Communities ==
=== Corning ===
Corning is a small unincorporated area on the southern border with Lansing Township. It is located along Minnesota State Highway 251.

=== Madison ===
Madison is a former village (now just a farm field) off U.S. Route 218 that once had a hotel, store, livery, post office and a sawmill. The Milwaukee Road refused to stop at Madison because it was so close to Lansing, a stop less than 4 miles away. The village was started on September 3, 1857, and it was declared dead in 1907.

== Cemeteries ==
- Red Oak Grove Cemetery is located in the southwest corner of the southwest quadrant of section 19 of the township. It is one and a half miles north of Corning on Mower/Freeborn Road. Its oldest known burial dates to 1857.
- Udolpho Cemetery is located in the northeast corner of the northwest quadrant of section 21 of the township. Its oldest known burial dates to 1862.
