= 1952 United States presidential election in Minnesota =

- November 4, 1952
- Turnout: 77.22%

Nominee	Dwight D. Eisenhower	Adlai Stevenson
Party	Republican	Democratic (DFL)
Home state	New York	Illinois
Running mate	Richard Nixon	John Sparkman
Electoral vote	11	0
Popular vote	763,211	608,458
Percentage	55.33%	44.11%
County results
Eisenhower
40–50%
50–60%
60–70%
70–80%
Stevenson
40–50%
50–60%
60–70%
President before election
Harry S. Truman
Democratic (DFL)
Elected President
Dwight D. Eisenhower
Republican

The 1952 United States presidential election in Minnesota took place on November 4, 1952, as part of the 1952 United States presidential election. Voters chose 11 electors, or representatives to the Electoral College, who voted for president and vice president.

Minnesota was won by the Republican candidate, former Supreme Allied Commander Europe General of the Army Dwight D. Eisenhower won the state over Illinois governor Adlai Stevenson by a margin of 154,753 votes, or 11.22%, which made Minnesota about 0.3% more Republican than the nation-at-large. Eisenhower went on to win the election nationally, with 442 electoral votes and a commanding 10.9% lead over Stevenson in the popular vote.

Incumbent President Harry S. Truman was the last president who was unaffected by the term limit imposed under the 22nd Amendment, but decided as early as 1950 that he would not seek another term. Eisenhower was the first Republican presidential nominee to win Minnesota (which had otherwise normally been a Democratic stronghold) since the Stock Market Crash of 1929 and the first Republican elected to the presidency and to win Minnesota since Herbert Hoover did so in 1928. Until the 2016 presidential election, this was the last time that the state was more Republican than the national average. This was also the last time Swift County voted Republican until 2016. To this date, this is the last election in which a Republican presidential candidate won Minnesota by double digits, as well as the last time a non-incumbent Republican won Minnesota.

On March 18, 1952, Minnesota held a presidential primary for the first time since 1916.

== Primary elections ==
=== Republican primary ===
The Republican primary took place on March 18, 1952. Harold Stassen and Edward C. Slettedahl were the two candidates on the ballot.

1952 Minnesota Republican presidential primary
Candidate	Votes	%
Harold E. Stassen	129,076	44.40
Dwight D. Eisenhower (write-in)	108,692	37.39
Robert A. Taft (write-in)	24,093	8.29
Edward C. Slettedahl	21,712	7.47
Earl Warren (write-in)	5,365	1.85
Douglas MacArthur (write-in)	1,369	0.47
Estes Kefauver (write-in)	386	0.13
Total	290,693	100.0

=== Democratic primary ===
The Democratic primary took place on March 18, 1952. Senator Hubert Humphrey was the only candidate on the ballot.

1952 Minnesota Democratic presidential primary
Candidate	Votes	%
Hubert Humphrey	102,527	80.04
Estes Kefauver (write-in)	20,182	15.76
Harry S. Truman (write-in)	3,634	2.84
Dwight D. Eisenhower (write-in)	1,753	1.37
Total	128,096	100.0

== Results ==
1952 United States presidential election in Minnesota
Party	Candidate	Votes	Percentage	Electoral votes
Republican	Dwight D. Eisenhower	763,211	55.33%	11
Democratic (DFL)	Adlai Stevenson	608,458	44.11%	0
Progressive	Vincent Hallinan	2,666	0.19%	0
Socialist Labor	Eric Hass	2,383	0.17%	0
Prohibition	Stuart Hamblen	2,147	0.16%	0
Socialist Workers	Farrell Dobbs	618	0.04%	0
Totals		1,379,483	100.00%	11

=== Results by county ===
County	Dwight D. Eisenhower Republican		Adlai Stevenson DFL		Various candidates Other parties		Margin		Total votes cast
County	#	%	#	%	#	%	#	%	Total votes cast
Aitkin	3,384	55.93%	2,577	42.60%	89	1.47%	807	13.33%	6,050
Anoka	7,425	44.09%	9,344	55.49%	70	0.42%	-1,919	-11.40%	16,839
Becker	5,815	55.84%	4,539	43.59%	60	0.58%	1,276	12.25%	10,414
Beltrami	4,817	53.75%	4,092	45.66%	53	0.59%	725	8.09%	8,962
Benton	3,856	59.54%	2,587	39.95%	33	0.51%	1,269	19.59%	6,476
Big Stone	2,260	51.46%	2,107	47.97%	25	0.57%	153	3.49%	4,392
Blue Earth	11,867	70.34%	4,952	29.35%	51	0.30%	6,915	40.99%	16,870
Brown	8,152	72.09%	3,129	27.67%	27	0.24%	5,023	44.42%	11,308
Carlton	4,175	39.03%	6,432	60.12%	91	0.85%	-2,257	-21.09%	10,698
Carver	6,674	75.43%	2,159	24.40%	15	0.17%	4,515	51.03%	8,848
Cass	4,601	61.46%	2,818	37.64%	67	0.90%	1,783	23.82%	7,486
Chippewa	4,411	57.90%	3,171	41.63%	36	0.47%	1,240	16.27%	7,618
Chisago	3,892	60.25%	2,536	39.26%	32	0.50%	1,356	20.99%	6,460
Clay	7,178	58.67%	5,036	41.16%	20	0.16%	2,142	17.51%	12,234
Clearwater	1,971	47.89%	2,089	50.75%	56	1.36%	-118	-2.86%	4,116
Cook	946	65.06%	503	34.59%	5	0.34%	443	30.47%	1,454
Cottonwood	5,488	71.51%	2,130	27.76%	56	0.73%	3,358	43.75%	7,674
Crow Wing	6,992	53.97%	5,883	45.41%	81	0.63%	1,109	8.56%	12,956
Dakota	11,871	49.71%	11,890	49.79%	118	0.49%	-19	-0.08%	23,879
Dodge	3,893	70.68%	1,582	28.72%	33	0.60%	2,311	41.96%	5,508
Douglas	6,037	61.30%	3,768	38.26%	43	0.44%	2,269	23.04%	9,848
Faribault	7,763	71.02%	3,120	28.55%	47	0.43%	4,643	42.47%	10,930
Fillmore	8,405	76.02%	2,612	23.62%	40	0.36%	5,793	52.40%	11,057
Freeborn	8,450	56.25%	6,525	43.44%	46	0.31%	1,925	12.81%	15,021
Goodhue	10,422	67.26%	5,037	32.51%	35	0.23%	5,385	34.75%	15,494
Grant	2,665	59.51%	1,791	40.00%	22	0.49%	874	19.51%	4,478
Hennepin	180,338	53.49%	155,388	46.09%	1,415	0.42%	24,950	7.40%	337,141
Houston	5,365	74.28%	1,830	25.34%	28	0.39%	3,535	48.94%	7,223
Hubbard	3,099	68.97%	1,360	30.27%	34	0.76%	1,739	38.70%	4,493
Isanti	2,682	52.16%	2,393	46.54%	67	1.30%	289	5.62%	5,142
Itasca	6,573	41.65%	9,128	57.84%	81	0.51%	-2,555	-16.19%	15,782
Jackson	4,558	62.08%	2,771	37.74%	13	0.18%	1,787	24.34%	7,342
Kanabec	2,205	55.85%	1,714	43.41%	29	0.73%	491	12.44%	3,948
Kandiyohi	6,370	49.97%	6,264	49.14%	113	0.89%	106	0.83%	12,747
Kittson	1,837	43.08%	2,387	55.98%	40	0.94%	-550	-12.90%	4,264
Koochiching	2,742	40.02%	4,078	59.52%	31	0.45%	-1,336	-19.50%	6,851
Lac qui Parle	3,924	58.52%	2,753	41.06%	28	0.42%	1,171	17.46%	6,705
Lake	1,451	33.83%	2,814	65.61%	24	0.56%	-1,363	-31.78%	4,289
Lake of the Woods	898	44.30%	1,117	55.11%	12	0.59%	-219	-10.81%	2,027
Le Sueur	5,776	63.19%	3,348	36.63%	16	0.18%	2,428	26.56%	9,140
Lincoln	2,746	58.96%	1,892	40.63%	19	0.41%	854	18.33%	4,657
Lyon	6,015	59.74%	4,030	40.02%	24	0.24%	1,985	19.72%	10,069
Mahnomen	1,220	45.86%	1,436	53.98%	4	0.15%	-216	-8.12%	2,660
Marshall	3,516	52.22%	3,132	46.52%	85	1.26%	384	5.70%	6,733
Martin	9,411	77.63%	2,673	22.05%	39	0.32%	6,738	55.58%	12,123
McLeod	7,246	72.11%	2,781	27.68%	21	0.21%	4,465	44.43%	10,048
Meeker	5,750	66.80%	2,833	32.91%	25	0.29%	2,917	33.89%	8,608
Mille Lacs	3,766	58.42%	2,639	40.94%	41	0.64%	1,127	17.48%	6,446
Morrison	6,050	56.87%	4,551	42.78%	38	0.36%	1,499	14.09%	10,639
Mower	9,862	53.16%	8,551	46.09%	138	0.74%	1,311	7.07%	18,551
Murray	4,054	65.15%	2,145	34.47%	24	0.39%	1,909	30.68%	6,223
Nicollet	5,775	68.77%	2,584	30.77%	39	0.46%	3,191	38.00%	8,398
Nobles	6,340	65.25%	3,351	34.49%	26	0.27%	2,989	30.76%	9,717
Norman	3,069	55.07%	2,465	44.23%	39	0.70%	604	10.84%	5,573
Olmsted	14,566	67.92%	6,792	31.67%	88	0.41%	7,774	36.25%	21,446
Otter Tail	16,447	75.03%	5,388	24.58%	86	0.39%	11,059	50.45%	21,921
Pennington	2,726	48.55%	2,802	49.90%	87	1.55%	-76	-1.35%	5,615
Pine	4,255	52.94%	3,692	45.93%	91	1.13%	563	7.01%	8,038
Pipestone	4,507	72.45%	1,701	27.34%	13	0.21%	2,806	45.11%	6,221
Polk	8,326	53.09%	7,244	46.19%	113	0.72%	1,082	6.90%	15,683
Pope	3,593	60.00%	2,381	39.76%	14	0.23%	1,212	20.24%	5,988
Ramsey	76,093	44.40%	93,783	54.73%	1,494	0.87%	-17,690	-10.33%	171,370
Red Lake	1,034	41.51%	1,431	57.45%	26	1.04%	-397	-15.94%	2,491
Redwood	7,093	72.30%	2,695	27.47%	22	0.22%	4,398	44.83%	9,810
Renville	6,742	63.45%	3,828	36.02%	56	0.53%	2,914	27.43%	10,626
Rice	9,334	68.17%	4,330	31.62%	29	0.21%	5,004	36.55%	13,693
Rock	3,774	74.48%	1,286	25.38%	7	0.14%	2,488	49.10%	5,067
Roseau	2,596	45.33%	3,062	53.47%	69	1.20%	-466	-8.14%	5,727
St. Louis	38,900	37.66%	63,032	61.03%	1,354	1.31%	-24,132	-23.37%	103,286
Scott	4,277	56.23%	3,315	43.58%	14	0.18%	962	12.65%	7,606
Sherburne	2,839	63.40%	1,630	36.40%	9	0.20%	1,209	27.00%	4,478
Sibley	5,323	73.79%	1,871	25.94%	20	0.28%	3,452	47.85%	7,214
Stearns	18,367	64.87%	9,907	34.99%	39	0.14%	8,460	29.88%	28,313
Steele	6,956	70.95%	2,819	28.75%	29	0.30%	4,137	42.20%	9,804
Stevens	3,288	67.39%	1,579	32.36%	12	0.25%	1,709	35.03%	4,879
Swift	3,532	51.40%	3,291	47.90%	48	0.70%	241	3.50%	6,871
Todd	6,731	65.92%	3,439	33.68%	41	0.40%	3,292	32.24%	10,211
Traverse	1,809	50.63%	1,756	49.15%	8	0.22%	53	1.48%	3,573
Wabasha	5,461	69.63%	2,356	30.04%	26	0.33%	3,105	39.59%	7,843
Wadena	3,662	68.54%	1,665	31.16%	16	0.30%	1,997	37.38%	5,343
Waseca	4,962	69.76%	2,132	29.97%	19	0.27%	2,830	39.79%	7,113
Washington	9,408	54.57%	7,768	45.06%	64	0.37%	1,640	9.51%	17,240
Watonwan	4,549	72.02%	1,752	27.74%	15	0.24%	2,797	44.28%	6,316
Wilkin	2,979	65.39%	1,564	34.33%	13	0.29%	1,415	31.06%	4,556
Winona	10,723	64.51%	5,834	35.10%	64	0.39%	4,889	29.41%	16,621
Wright	8,089	64.64%	4,373	34.94%	52	0.42%	3,716	29.70%	12,514
Yellow Medicine	4,322	57.73%	3,143	41.99%	21	0.28%	1,179	15.74%	7,486
Totals	763,211	55.33%	608,458	44.11%	7,814	0.57%	154,753	11.22%	1,379,483

==== Counties that flipped from Democratic to Republican ====
- Aitkin
- Becker
- Beltrami
- Benton
- Big Stone
- Cass
- Chippewa
- Clay
- Chisago
- Crow Wing
- Cook
- Cottonwood
- Dodge
- Douglas
- Faribault
- Freeborn
- Goodhue
- Hennepin
- Grant
- Hubbard
- Isanti
- Kandiyohi
- Kanabec
- Jackson
- Lac qui Parle
- Le Sueur
- Lincoln
- Lyon
- Marshall
- Martin
- Meeker
- Mille Lacs
- Morrison
- Mower
- Murray
- Micollet
- Nobles
- Norman
- Olmsted
- Pine
- Polk
- Pipestone
- Pope
- Redwood
- Renville
- Rock
- Scott
- Stearns
- Sherburne
- Swift
- Stevens
- Todd
- Wabasha
- Wadena
- Washington
- Watonwan
- Wilkin
- Winona
- Yellow Medicine

== See also ==
- United States presidential elections in Minnesota
