= 1972 United States presidential election in Minnesota =

- November 7, 1972
- Turnout: 70.31% ▼

Nominee	Richard Nixon	George McGovern
Party	Republican	Democratic (DFL)
Home state	California	South Dakota
Running mate	Spiro Agnew	Sargent Shriver
Electoral vote	10	0
Popular vote	898,269	802,346
Percentage	51.58%	46.07%

Nixon
40–50%
50–60%
60–70%
70–80%
80–90%
90–100%
McGovern
40–50%
50–60%
60–70%
70–80%
80–90%
90–100%
President before election
Richard Nixon
Republican
Elected President
Richard Nixon
Republican

The 1972 United States presidential election in Minnesota took place on November 7, 1972, as part of the 1972 United States presidential election. Voters chose ten electors, or representatives to the Electoral College, who voted for president and vice president.

Minnesota was won by the Republican candidate, incumbent President Richard Nixon, who won the state over U.S. Senator George McGovern of South Dakota by a margin of 95,923 votes, or 5.51%, the closest state in the election. This result made Minnesota around 18% more Democratic than the nation as a whole. Nixon went on to win the election nationally, by a landslide margin of 23.15% of the popular vote. McGovern carried only Massachusetts and the District of Columbia.

As of the 2024 presidential election, this is the last time that the Republican nominee carried Minnesota, as well as the last election in which the Midwest voted unanimously in the electoral college. Minnesota would go on to have the longest streak voting for Democrats out of any state after this election, as every other state would be won by Ronald Reagan in his landslide re-election in 1984. This is also the last time a Republican has won heavily populated Hennepin County, while Rice County would not vote Republican again until 2016 and Pine County until 2012. Nixon further became the first-ever Republican to win the White House without carrying Stevens County, which was one of six counties outside of McGovern's home state of South Dakota that he flipped nationwide. Had Nixon lost the state, then this would have been a time in history that a Republican president was elected twice without ever carrying Minnesota at least once, and the first of any party since Woodrow Wilson did so in 1916; this feat would be eventually accomplished 12 years later by Reagan. Minnesota would also have had the longest streak of any state voting for same party since 1960.

During Nixon's second term as president, the Watergate scandal resulted in the loss of the Republican Party's credibility both nationally and in Minnesota. The damage caused by Watergate was so pronounced that the Republican Party of Minnesota was forced to rebrand itself as the "Independent-Republican Party" from 1975 to 1995 to distance itself from the national Republican Party.

== Results ==
1972 United States presidential election in Minnesota
Party	Candidate	Votes	Percentage	Electoral votes
Republican	Richard Nixon (incumbent)	898,269	51.58%	10
Democratic-Farmer-Labor	George McGovern	802,346	46.07%	0
American	John G. Schmitz	31,407	1.80%	0
Socialist Labor	Louis Fisher	4,261	0.24%	0
People's	Benjamin Spock	2,805	0.16%	0
Write-ins	Write-ins	962	0.06%	0
Socialist Workers	Linda Jenness	940	0.05%	0
Communist	Gus Hall	662	0.04%	0
Invalid or blank votes				—
Totals		1,978,590	100.00%	10
Voter turnout		77%		—

=== Results by county ===
County	Richard Nixon Republican		George McGovern DFL		John G. Schmitz American		Various candidates Other parties		Margin		Total votes cast
County	#	%	#	%	#	%	#	%	#	%	Total votes cast
Aitkin	3,241	53.73%	2,687	44.55%	58	0.96%	46	0.76%	554	9.18%	6,032
Anoka	29,546	49.77%	28,031	47.22%	1,312	2.21%	471	0.79%	1,515	2.55%	59,360
Becker	6,033	55.43%	4,695	43.14%	123	1.13%	33	0.30%	1,338	12.29%	10,884
Beltrami	5,947	52.20%	5,194	45.59%	210	1.84%	42	0.37%	753	6.61%	11,393
Benton	4,652	49.35%	4,282	45.43%	438	4.65%	54	0.57%	370	3.92%	9,426
Big Stone	1,748	43.52%	2,185	54.39%	71	1.77%	13	0.32%	-437	-10.87%	4,017
Blue Earth	12,702	53.68%	10,638	44.96%	216	0.91%	106	0.45%	2,064	8.72%	23,662
Brown	7,791	61.21%	4,347	34.15%	557	4.38%	34	0.27%	3,444	27.06%	12,729
Carlton	5,445	42.77%	7,116	55.90%	111	0.87%	58	0.46%	-1,671	-13.13%	12,730
Carver	8,546	61.46%	4,852	34.89%	446	3.21%	61	0.44%	3,694	26.57%	13,905
Cass	4,906	57.70%	3,347	39.36%	219	2.58%	31	0.36%	1,559	18.34%	8,503
Chippewa	3,787	50.18%	3,630	48.10%	114	1.51%	16	0.21%	157	2.08%	7,547
Chisago	4,718	51.06%	4,174	45.17%	306	3.31%	43	0.47%	544	5.89%	9,241
Clay	11,089	54.36%	9,076	44.49%	169	0.83%	66	0.32%	2,013	9.87%	20,400
Clearwater	1,819	49.39%	1,751	47.54%	90	2.44%	23	0.62%	68	1.85%	3,683
Cook	1,047	57.62%	742	40.84%	21	1.16%	7	0.39%	305	16.78%	1,817
Cottonwood	4,396	60.19%	2,802	38.37%	94	1.29%	11	0.15%	1,594	21.82%	7,303
Crow Wing	8,774	53.01%	7,328	44.28%	329	1.99%	120	0.73%	1,446	8.73%	16,551
Dakota	34,967	53.96%	28,479	43.95%	951	1.47%	399	0.62%	6,488	10.01%	64,796
Dodge	3,863	65.08%	1,921	32.36%	139	2.34%	13	0.22%	1,942	32.72%	5,936
Douglas	6,678	52.97%	5,501	43.64%	389	3.09%	38	0.30%	1,177	9.33%	12,606
Faribault	6,503	64.05%	3,519	34.66%	105	1.03%	26	0.26%	2,984	29.39%	10,153
Fillmore	7,107	67.94%	3,155	30.16%	161	1.54%	37	0.35%	3,952	37.78%	10,460
Freeborn	9,747	56.90%	7,163	41.82%	162	0.95%	58	0.34%	2,584	15.08%	17,130
Goodhue	11,107	63.00%	6,147	34.86%	293	1.66%	84	0.48%	4,960	28.14%	17,631
Grant	1,899	46.84%	2,085	51.43%	55	1.36%	15	0.37%	-186	-4.59%	4,054
Hennepin	228,951	51.64%	205,943	46.45%	6,386	1.44%	2,078	0.47%	23,008	5.19%	443,358
Houston	5,186	66.57%	2,467	31.67%	103	1.32%	34	0.44%	2,719	34.90%	7,790
Hubbard	3,294	59.31%	2,136	38.46%	105	1.89%	19	0.34%	1,158	20.85%	5,554
Isanti	3,715	48.66%	3,660	47.94%	223	2.92%	36	0.47%	55	0.72%	7,634
Itasca	7,558	45.58%	8,683	52.36%	238	1.44%	104	0.63%	-1,125	-6.78%	16,583
Jackson	3,599	51.50%	3,304	47.27%	65	0.93%	21	0.30%	295	4.23%	6,989
Kanabec	2,395	51.71%	1,969	42.51%	243	5.25%	25	0.54%	426	9.20%	4,632
Kandiyohi	6,624	45.74%	7,241	50.00%	511	3.53%	105	0.73%	-617	-4.26%	14,481
Kittson	1,832	52.66%	1,584	45.53%	50	1.44%	13	0.37%	248	7.13%	3,479
Koochiching	3,681	50.91%	3,396	46.97%	118	1.63%	35	0.48%	285	3.94%	7,230
Lac qui Parle	2,773	48.43%	2,845	49.69%	96	1.68%	12	0.21%	-72	-1.26%	5,726
Lake	2,575	40.70%	3,640	57.53%	65	1.03%	47	0.74%	-1,065	-16.83%	6,327
Lake of the Woods	877	55.44%	672	42.48%	29	1.83%	4	0.25%	205	12.96%	1,582
Le Sueur	5,388	52.50%	4,725	46.04%	107	1.04%	42	0.41%	663	6.46%	10,262
Lincoln	1,881	45.93%	2,148	52.45%	55	1.34%	11	0.27%	-267	-6.52%	4,095
Lyon	5,820	50.04%	5,614	48.27%	141	1.21%	55	0.47%	206	1.77%	11,630
Mahnomen	1,246	46.30%	1,397	51.91%	37	1.37%	11	0.41%	-151	-5.61%	2,691
Marshall	3,264	52.73%	2,790	45.07%	100	1.62%	36	0.58%	474	7.66%	6,190
Martin	7,569	64.59%	3,816	32.57%	311	2.65%	22	0.19%	3,753	32.02%	11,718
McLeod	7,820	61.42%	4,538	35.64%	321	2.52%	54	0.42%	3,282	25.78%	12,733
Meeker	5,097	57.06%	3,601	40.31%	196	2.19%	39	0.44%	1,496	16.75%	8,933
Mille Lacs	4,291	55.83%	3,221	41.91%	147	1.91%	27	0.35%	1,070	13.92%	7,686
Morrison	5,714	46.35%	5,993	48.61%	568	4.61%	54	0.44%	-279	-2.26%	12,329
Mower	9,929	48.36%	10,286	50.10%	193	0.94%	122	0.59%	-357	-1.74%	20,530
Murray	2,959	49.92%	2,893	48.81%	58	0.98%	17	0.29%	66	1.11%	5,927
Nicollet	6,230	56.28%	4,680	42.28%	110	0.99%	49	0.44%	1,550	14.00%	11,069
Nobles	4,951	47.04%	5,464	51.91%	72	0.68%	38	0.36%	-513	-4.87%	10,525
Norman	2,536	50.76%	2,444	48.92%	2	0.04%	14	0.28%	92	1.84%	4,996
Olmsted	23,806	68.96%	9,817	28.44%	753	2.18%	145	0.42%	13,989	40.52%	34,521
Otter Tail	13,519	62.21%	7,881	36.27%	264	1.21%	67	0.31%	5,638	25.94%	21,731
Pennington	3,548	53.72%	2,892	43.79%	147	2.23%	18	0.27%	656	9.93%	6,605
Pine	3,881	48.41%	3,794	47.32%	306	3.82%	36	0.45%	87	1.09%	8,017
Pipestone	3,543	55.57%	2,758	43.26%	59	0.93%	16	0.25%	785	12.31%	6,376
Polk	8,139	51.24%	7,366	46.37%	337	2.12%	43	0.27%	773	4.87%	15,885
Pope	2,610	45.94%	2,910	51.22%	150	2.64%	11	0.19%	-300	-5.28%	5,681
Ramsey	95,716	45.59%	108,392	51.63%	3,559	1.70%	2,284	1.09%	-12,676	-6.04%	209,951
Red Lake	1,052	41.40%	1,409	55.45%	72	2.83%	8	0.31%	-357	-14.05%	2,541
Redwood	5,776	62.43%	3,177	34.34%	275	2.97%	24	0.26%	2,599	28.09%	9,252
Renville	5,329	53.06%	4,499	44.79%	177	1.76%	39	0.39%	830	8.27%	10,044
Rice	9,195	52.62%	8,065	46.15%	156	0.89%	59	0.34%	1,130	6.47%	17,475
Rock	3,470	61.83%	2,089	37.22%	44	0.78%	9	0.16%	1,381	24.61%	5,612
Roseau	2,844	53.22%	2,396	44.84%	85	1.59%	19	0.36%	448	8.38%	5,344
St. Louis	41,435	39.77%	61,103	58.65%	862	0.83%	780	0.75%	-19,668	-18.88%	104,180
Scott	7,310	50.85%	6,745	46.92%	259	1.80%	62	0.43%	565	3.93%	14,376
Sherburne	4,332	50.03%	4,070	47.01%	209	2.41%	47	0.54%	262	3.02%	8,658
Sibley	4,543	64.17%	2,433	34.36%	77	1.09%	27	0.38%	2,110	29.81%	7,080
Stearns	18,951	45.78%	19,315	46.65%	2,873	6.94%	261	0.63%	-364	-0.87%	41,400
Steele	7,678	64.69%	4,010	33.79%	146	1.23%	34	0.29%	3,668	30.90%	11,868
Stevens	2,830	48.70%	2,870	49.39%	92	1.58%	19	0.33%	-40	-0.69%	5,811
Swift	2,673	40.40%	3,823	57.78%	116	1.75%	5	0.08%	-1,150	-17.38%	6,617
Todd	5,387	53.14%	4,270	42.12%	447	4.41%	33	0.33%	1,117	11.02%	10,137
Traverse	1,276	41.77%	1,744	57.09%	30	0.98%	5	0.16%	-468	-15.32%	3,055
Wabasha	5,158	61.31%	3,017	35.86%	214	2.54%	24	0.29%	2,141	25.45%	8,413
Wadena	3,408	57.05%	2,430	40.68%	124	2.08%	12	0.20%	978	16.37%	5,974
Waseca	5,064	63.89%	2,767	34.91%	69	0.87%	26	0.33%	2,297	28.98%	7,926
Washington	19,142	53.03%	16,102	44.61%	615	1.70%	239	0.66%	3,040	8.42%	36,098
Watonwan	3,960	63.35%	2,229	35.66%	49	0.78%	13	0.21%	1,731	27.69%	6,251
Wilkin	2,292	56.00%	1,739	42.49%	47	1.15%	15	0.37%	553	13.51%	4,093
Winona	10,910	56.45%	8,080	41.81%	237	1.23%	100	0.52%	2,830	14.64%	19,327
Wright	9,996	51.56%	8,695	44.85%	615	3.17%	80	0.41%	1,301	6.71%	19,386
Yellow Medicine	3,683	50.32%	3,462	47.30%	128	1.75%	46	0.63%	221	3.02%	7,319
Totals	898,269	51.58%	802,346	46.07%	31,407	1.80%	9,630	0.55%	95,923	5.51%	1,741,652

== See also ==
- United States presidential elections in Minnesota
