= Frankford Township, Mower County, Minnesota =

Frankford Township, Minnesota
- Township
- Location within the state of Minnesota Frankford Township, Minnesota (the United States)
- Coordinates: 43°43′12″N 92°29′39″W
- Country: United States
- State: Minnesota
- County: Mower

Area
  - Total: 30.0 sq mi (77.7 km^{2})
  - Land: 30.0 sq mi (77.6 km^{2})
  - Water: 0 sq mi (0.0 km^{2})
- Elevation: 1,300 ft (400 m)

Population (2000)
  - Total: 358
  - Density: 12/sq mi (4.6/km^{2})
- Time zone: UTC−6 (Central (CST))
  - Summer (DST): UTC−5 (CDT)
- ZIP Code: 55936
- Area code: 507
- FIPS code: 27-22328
- GNIS feature ID: 0664215
- Website: https://frankfordtownship.net/

Frankford Township is a township in Mower County, Minnesota, United States. The population was 358 at the 2000 census. The largest town located partially within the township is Grand Meadow, with a population of 945 people. The eastern half of Grand Meadow is in Frankford Township and the western half is in Grand Meadow Township. All other areas of the township are unincorporated. There was a village called Frankford on Deer Creek in the far eastern part of the township near Fillmore County. It almost became the county seat but lost this distinction to Austin.

== Geography ==
According to the United States Census Bureau, the township has a total area of 30.0 square miles (78 km^{2}), of which 30.0 square miles (78 km^{2}) is land and 0.03% is water.

== Demographics ==
As of the census of 2000, there were 358 people, 125 households, and 101 families residing in the township. The population density was 11.9 people per square mile (4.6/km^{2}). There were 131 housing units at an average density of 4.4/sq mi (1.7/km^{2}). The racial makeup of the township was 100.00% White.

There were 125 households, out of which 38.4% had children under the age of 18 living with them, 76.0% were married couples living together, 4.0% had a female householder with no husband present, and 18.4% were non-families. 16.8% of all households were made up of individuals, and 5.6% had someone living alone who was 65 years of age or older. The average household size was 2.86 and the average family size was 3.24.

In the township the age distribution of the population showed 28.2% under the age of 18, 7.5% from 18 to 24, 28.5% from 25 to 44, 26.8% from 45 to 64, and 8.9% who were 65 years of age or older. The median age was 38 years. For every 100 females, there were 114.4 males. For every 100 females age 18 and over, there were 110.7 males.

The median income for a household in the township was $56,250, and the median income for a family was $61,250. Males had a median income of $31,641 versus $31,771 for females. The per capita income for the township was $21,845. About 4.0% of families and 5.6% of the population were below the poverty line, including 4.4% of those under age 18 and 11.9% of those age 65 or over.

== Frankford Village ==
The village of Frankford Village was settled along the banks of Deer Creek in 1854 by Lewis Patchin, Bartlett Leathers, and Byron Woodworth. The town was platted in 1856 and it was declared the county seat. At one time it was a bustling frontier village that had three stores, a schoolhouse, a cemetery, three blacksmith and wagon shops, a gristmill, a chair and coffin factory, a shoe shop and the Patchin Hotel which also served as the post office. County court was held here and the county's records were stored in an upstairs room of Patchin's Hotel. After being passed over as the county's seat, its population slowly dwindled. When the Southern Minnesota Railroad was laid in 1870 it ran four miles south of the village and this development is what ultimately spelled doom for the once-thriving community. Rather than move the city to the railroad as the citizens of the Old Village of Le Roy did, the citizens simply relocated to other parts of the township and county. All that is left of the old village is a cemetery, which is still used, that can be found in the northeast quadrant of section 24 of Frankford Township. The old hotel still stands but now a residential area now. The old school was taking down in the 1970s.

== Cemeteries ==
- Frankford Cemetery is located in the northeast quadrant of section 24 of the township. It is directly south of the Old Frankford Village.
- Bear Creek Cemetery is located in the southeast quadrant of section 7 of the township. Its oldest known burial dates to 1872.
- Methodist Norwegian Cemetery is a deserted cemetery located in the southeast quadrant of section 7 of the township. Its last burial dates to 1940.
- Sever Temanson Cemetery is located in the southwest corner of the northwest quadrant of section 8 of the township. It is now not used, but it was used for burials between 1854 and 1870.
