= Austin Township, Mower County, Minnesota =

Austin Township, Minnesota
- Township
- Location within the state of Minnesota Austin Township, Minnesota (the United States)
- Coordinates: 43°37′58″N 93°0′0″W
- Country: United States
- State: Minnesota
- County: Mower

Area
  - Total: 29.2 sq mi (75.7 km^{2})
  - Land: 29.2 sq mi (75.7 km^{2})
  - Water: 0 sq mi (0.0 km^{2})
- Elevation: 1,207 ft (368 m)

Population (2000)
  - Total: 1,396
  - Density: 48/sq mi (18.4/km^{2})
- Time zone: UTC-6 (Central (CST))
  - Summer (DST): UTC-5 (CDT)
- ZIP code: 55912
- Area code: 507
- FIPS code: 27-02926
- GNIS feature ID: 0663483

Austin Township is a township in Mower County, Minnesota, United States. The population was 1,396 at the 2000 census. The largest city partially in the township is Austin with a population of 24,718 people. The northern parts of the city of Austin are in Lansing Township. All other population centers are unincorporated areas.

== Geography ==
According to the United States Census Bureau, the township has a total area of 29.2 square miles (76 km^{2}), all land.

== Demographics ==
As of the census of 2000, there were 1,396 people, 507 households, and 396 families residing in the township. The population density was 47.8 inhabitants per square mile (18.5/km^{2}). There were 527 housing units at an average density of 18.0 per square mile (6.9/km^{2}). The racial makeup of the township was 95.3% White, 0.1% African American, 0.2% Native American, 1.3% Asian, 2.0% from other races, and 0.7% from two or more races. Hispanic or Latino of any race were 3.7% of the population.

There were 507 households, out of which 34.7% had children under the age of 18 living with them, 67.3% were married couples living together, 4.9% had a female householder with no husband present, and 21.7% were non-families. 17.2% of all households were made up of individuals, and 7.9% had someone living alone who was 65 years of age or older. The average household size was 2.68 and the average family size was 2.96.

In the township, the population was spread out, with 28.2% under the age of 18, 8.4% from 18 to 24, 25.1% from 25 to 44, 24.9% from 45 to 64, and 13.4% who were 65 years of age or older. The median age was 38 years. For every 100 females, there were 111.2 males. For every 100 females age 18 and over, there were 104.9 males.

The median income for a household in the township was $48,958, and the median income for a family was $54,167. Males had a median income of $35,250 versus $19,779 for females. The per capita income for the township was $19,999. About 2.7% of families and 4.9% of the population were below the poverty line, including 6.5% of those under age 18 and none of those age 65 or over.

== Communities ==
=== Varco Station ===
Varco Station was a small village which used to be about three miles south of the city of Austin on the Milwaukee Railroad. It was started in 1875 by Thomas Varco and at one time had a grain elevator. The railroad continued to deliver freight to Varco Station as late as the 1950s. It still is a small unincorporated settlement along Mower County Highway 4.

=== Two Rivers ===
The old town of Two Rivers (also known as Milton) was located where Turtle Creek flows into the Cedar River. It was platted in 1857. This area is currently within the city limits of the city of Austin on 4th Street S.W. near Calvary Cemetery. At one time, the small community had a mill and a hotel. Its population dwindled as the city of Austin continued to grow and was eventually incorporated by it.

== Cemeteries ==
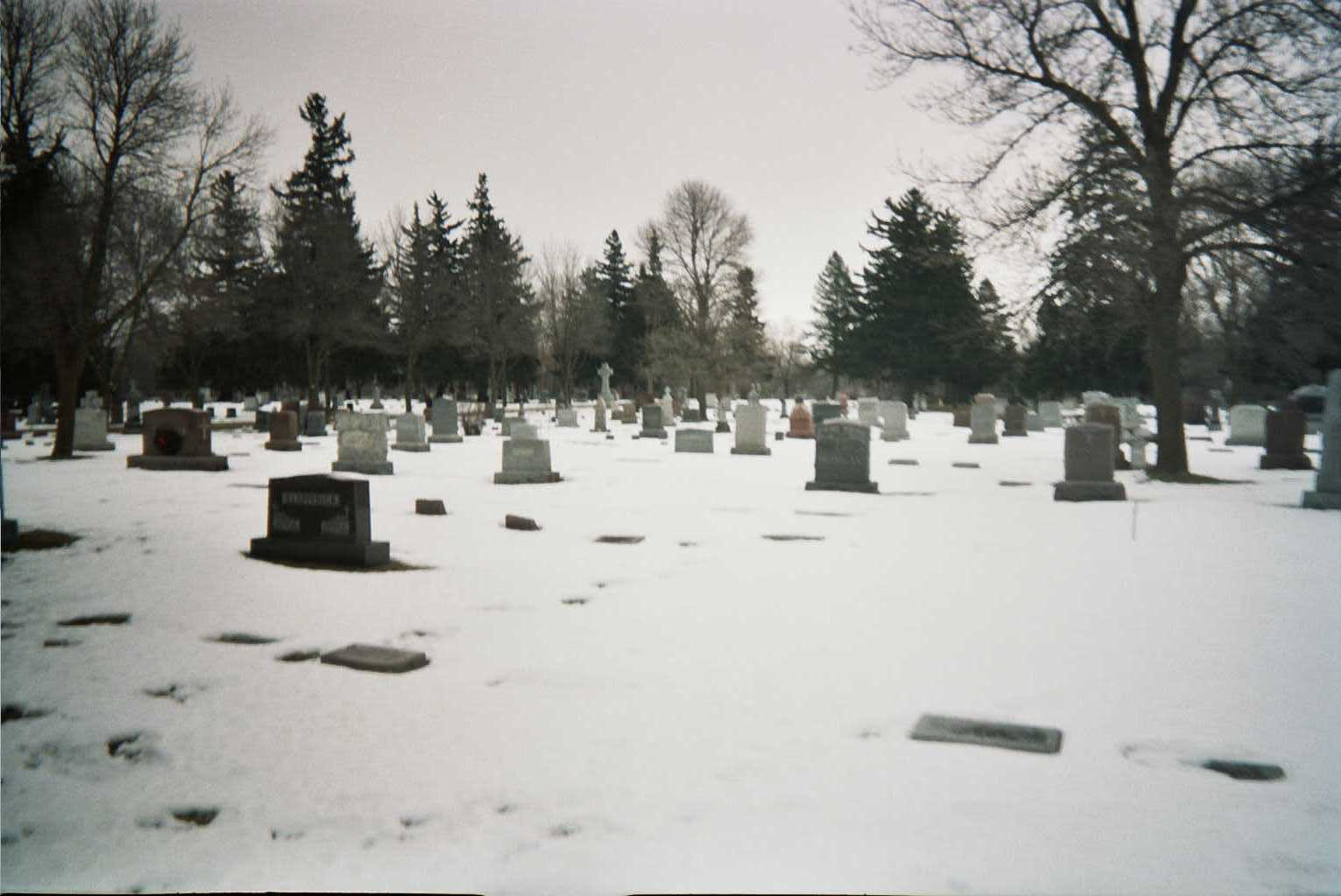
Calvary Cemetery in Austin

- Cedar City Cemetery is located in the far southeast corner of the southeast quadrant of section 32 of the township. The land was donated by David Chandler, the first settler of the short-lived community of Cedar City, and in 1879 it had 42 lots. The first burial on record was of a man named Robinson, assistant editor of the Mower County Mirror. Strips of land were added at various times over the years, the largest addition coming in 1957, a donation by Mr. and Mrs. Claude Brown.
- Rose Creek Cemetery is located in the southwest quadrant of section 34 of the township on the banks of Rose Creek.
- Calvary Cemetery is located in section 10 of the township within Austin's city limits.
