= Cedar River (Iowa River tributary) =

338-mile-long (544 km) river in Minnesota and Iowa

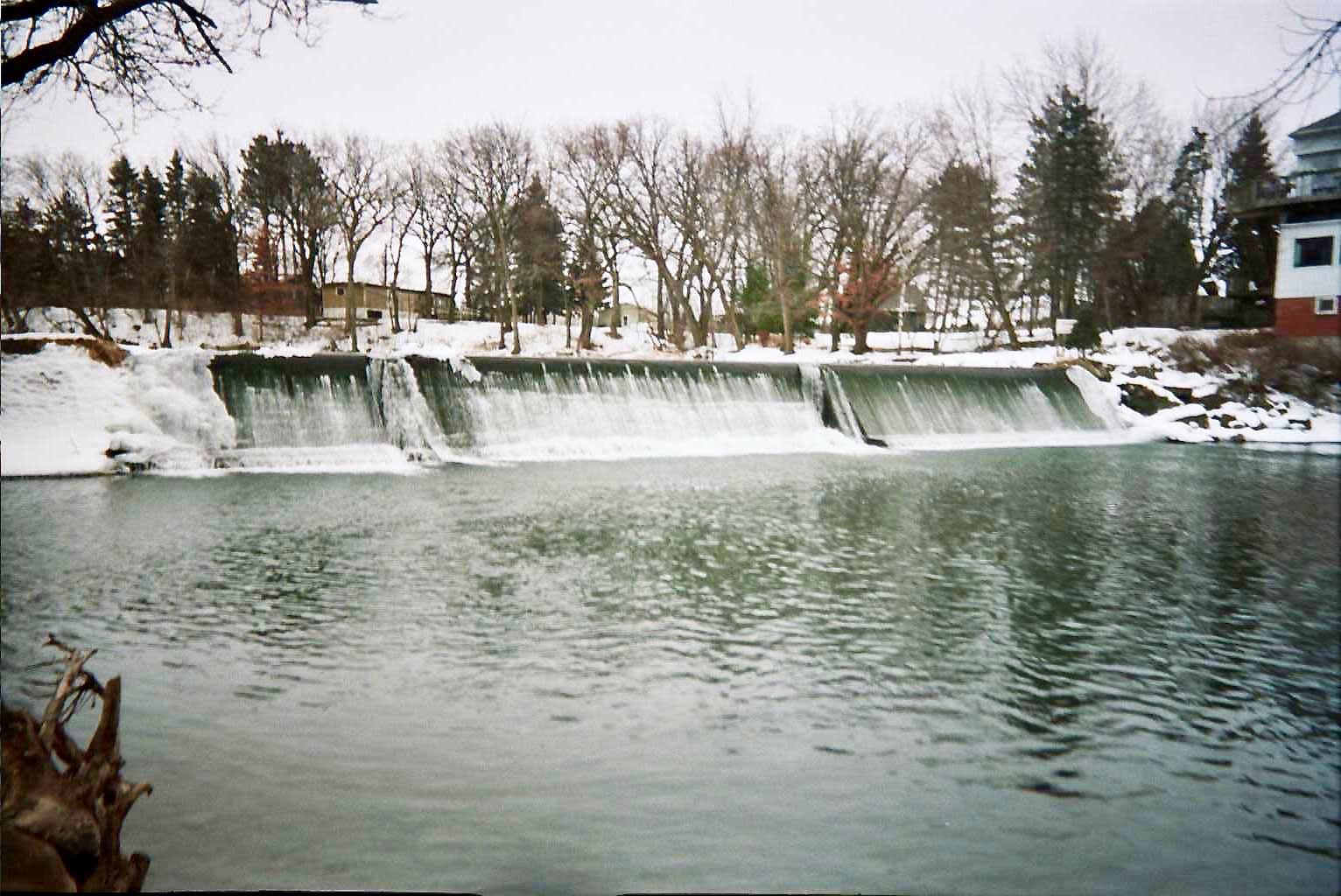
- Cedar River at the Ramsey Mill Pond near Austin, Minnesota

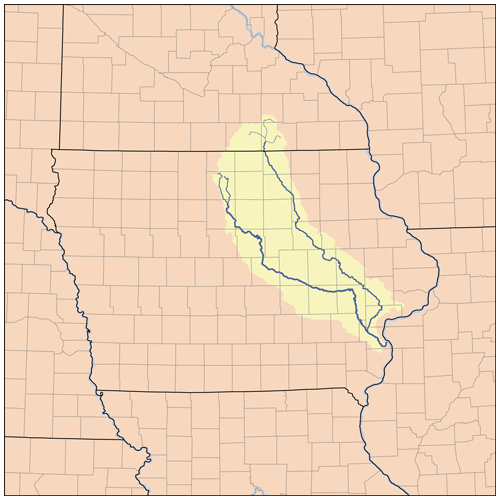
- Map showing the Cedar (to the right) and Iowa (to the left) rivers.

Location
- Country: United States
- State: Iowa, Minnesota
- Cities: Austin, Minnesota, Cedar Falls, Iowa, Waterloo, Iowa, and Cedar Rapids, Iowa

Physical characteristics
- Source
  - location: Sargeant, Minnesota
  - coordinates: 43°50′05″N 92°48′28″W
- Mouth: Iowa River
  - location: Columbus Junction, Iowa
  - coordinates: 41°16′59″N 91°20′49″W
- Length: 338-mile-long (544 km)

Basin features
- River system: Mississippi River

The Cedar River is a 338-mile-long (544 km) river in Minnesota and Iowa. It is a tributary of the Iowa River, which flows to the Mississippi River. The Cedar River takes its name from the red cedar (Juniperus virginiana) trees growing there, and was originally called the Red Cedar River by the Meskwaki. The first Mississippi steamboat reached Cedar Rapids, Iowa in 1844, and during the next decade, the Red Cedar (as it was still called) was an important commercial waterway. The surrounding region is known officially as the Cedar River Valley, though it is more commonly referred to simply as the Cedar Valley. The stream is young geologically, and only in places where the glacial material has been removed is the underlying bedrock exposed.

== Geography ==
The headwaters of the Cedar River are located in Dodge County, Minnesota, consisting of a west fork and middle fork approximately three miles northeast of the town of Blooming Prairie, and an east fork approximately one mile south of the town of Hayfield. It then flows into Mower County, Minnesota through the townships of Udolpho, Lansing, Austin (where Turtle Creek and Dobbins Creek join it), and Lyle. It then flows into Mitchell County, Iowa and Floyd County, Iowa with the endpoint being located in Louisa County, Iowa at the town of Columbus Junction, where it joins with the Iowa River which then winds its way to the Mississippi River. Despite being a tributary of the Iowa River, it appears larger than the Iowa River at their confluence point. Palisades-Kepler State Park is located on the Cedar River near Cedar Rapids.

At Conesville, Iowa, the Cedar River is approximately 5,798 cubic feet per second.

Cedar County, Iowa is named for the river.

Major cities (with populations greater than 20,000) located along the Cedar River include Austin, Minnesota, Cedar Falls, Iowa, Waterloo, Iowa, and Cedar Rapids, Iowa.

== Flooding ==
=== 1993 ===
In 1993, the river flooded some areas of downtown Cedar Rapids. The river crested at 19.83 feet. This was the worst flood in Iowa's recorded history, before the Cedar River flooded again in 2008.

=== 2008 ===
In 2008, flooding of the river caused the evacuation of around 20,000 of Cedar Rapids' residents and flooded over 1,200 blocks of the city. The Cedar River crested at 31.3 ft (19 feet above flood stage) Upriver, the Waterloo-Cedar Falls metropolitan area was less affected, thanks mainly to the large dikes that protect the downtowns of both cities. To the north, the flooding Cedar River collapsed Charles City's landmark suspension bridge, as well as destroying many homes and community parks.

== See also ==
- List of Iowa rivers
- List of Minnesota rivers
- List of longest streams of Minnesota
- List of longest streams of Iowa
