= Wind power in Iowa =

Electricity from wind in one U.S. state

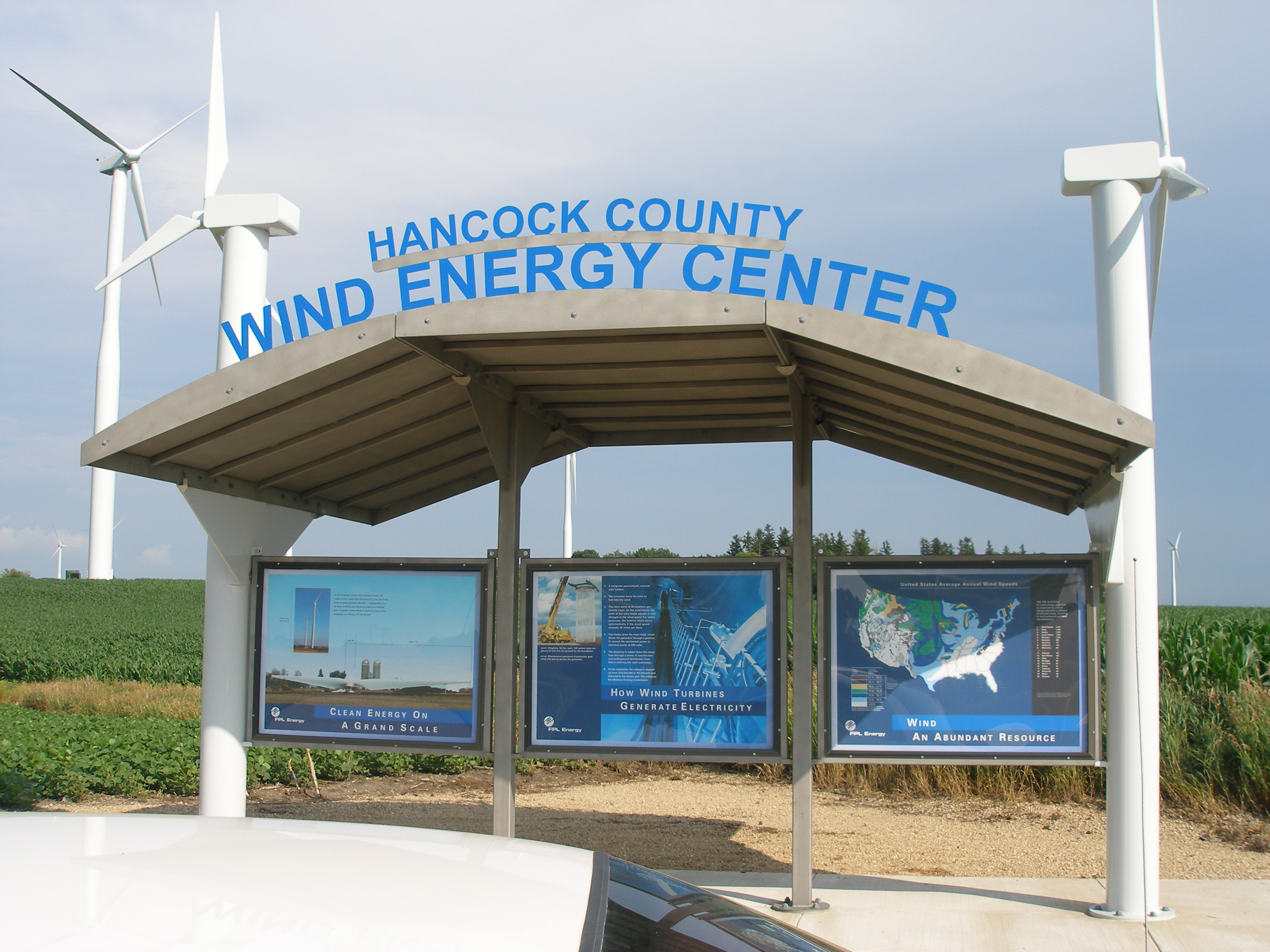
Hancock County Wind Energy Center in Hancock County, Iowa, with 148 Vestas V47-660kW wind turbines for a total nameplate capacity of 97.68 MW. Half of the wind turbines are southwest of Klemme and the other half are south-southeast of Duncan. NextEra Energy Resources owns the wind farm, which began operating in 2002.

Making up over 64% of the state's generated electricity in 2024, wind power is the largest source of electricity generation in Iowa. In 2020, over 34 billion kWh of electrical energy was generated by wind power. As of 2022, Iowa has over 12,200 megawatts (MW) of installed capacity with over 6,000 wind turbines, ranking second and third in the nation below Texas respectively.

The development of wind power in Iowa began with a state law, enacted in 1983, requiring investor-owned utilities in the state to purchase 105 MW of power from wind generation. Former governor Terry Branstad stated that by 2020 the percentage of wind generated electricity in Iowa could reach 40 percent. This goal has been exceeded, with over 40 percent of Iowa's electricity being generated from the wind as of October 2019 according to the Energy Information Administration, a first in the nation accomplishment.

== Overview ==
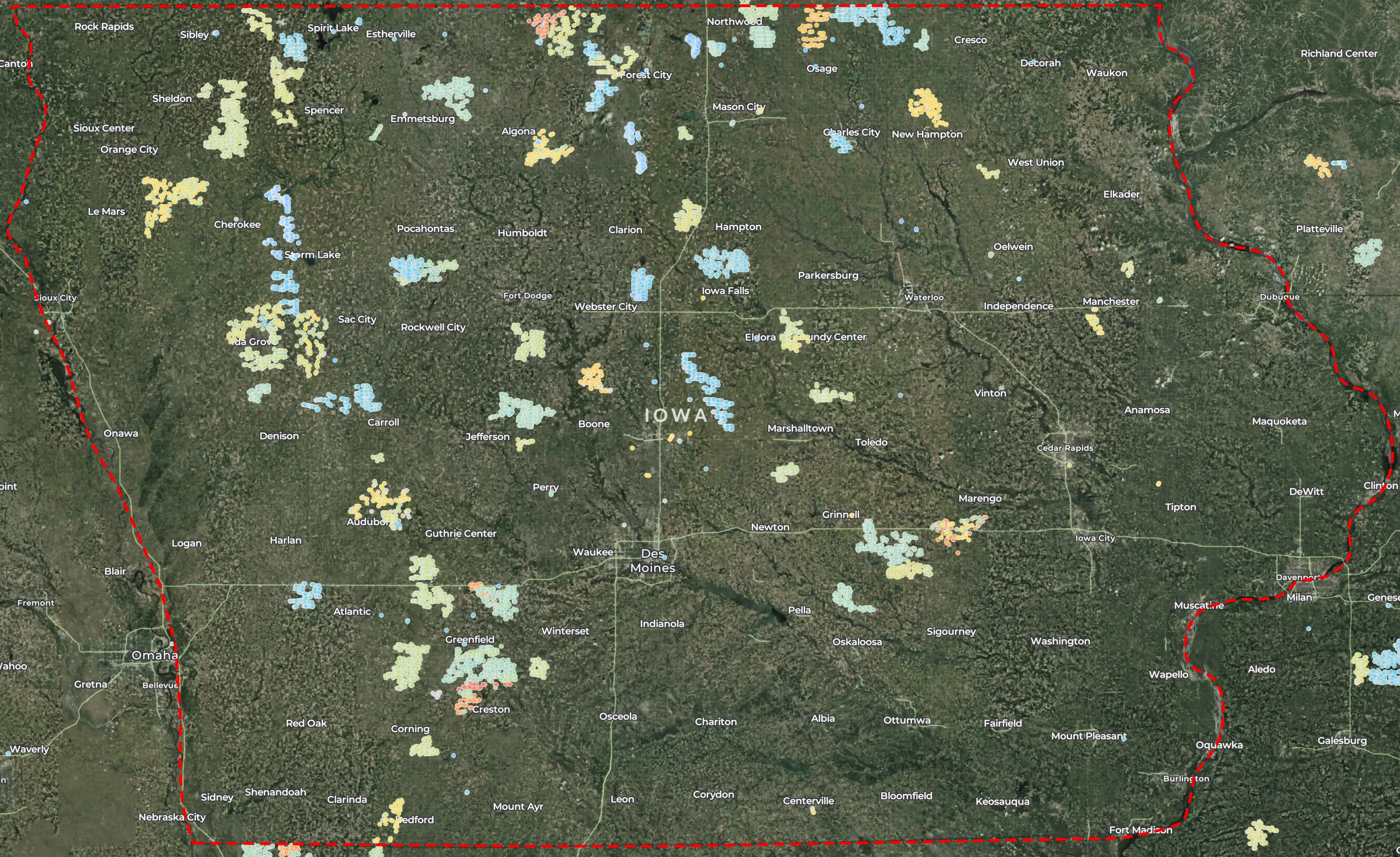
Iowa wind power map

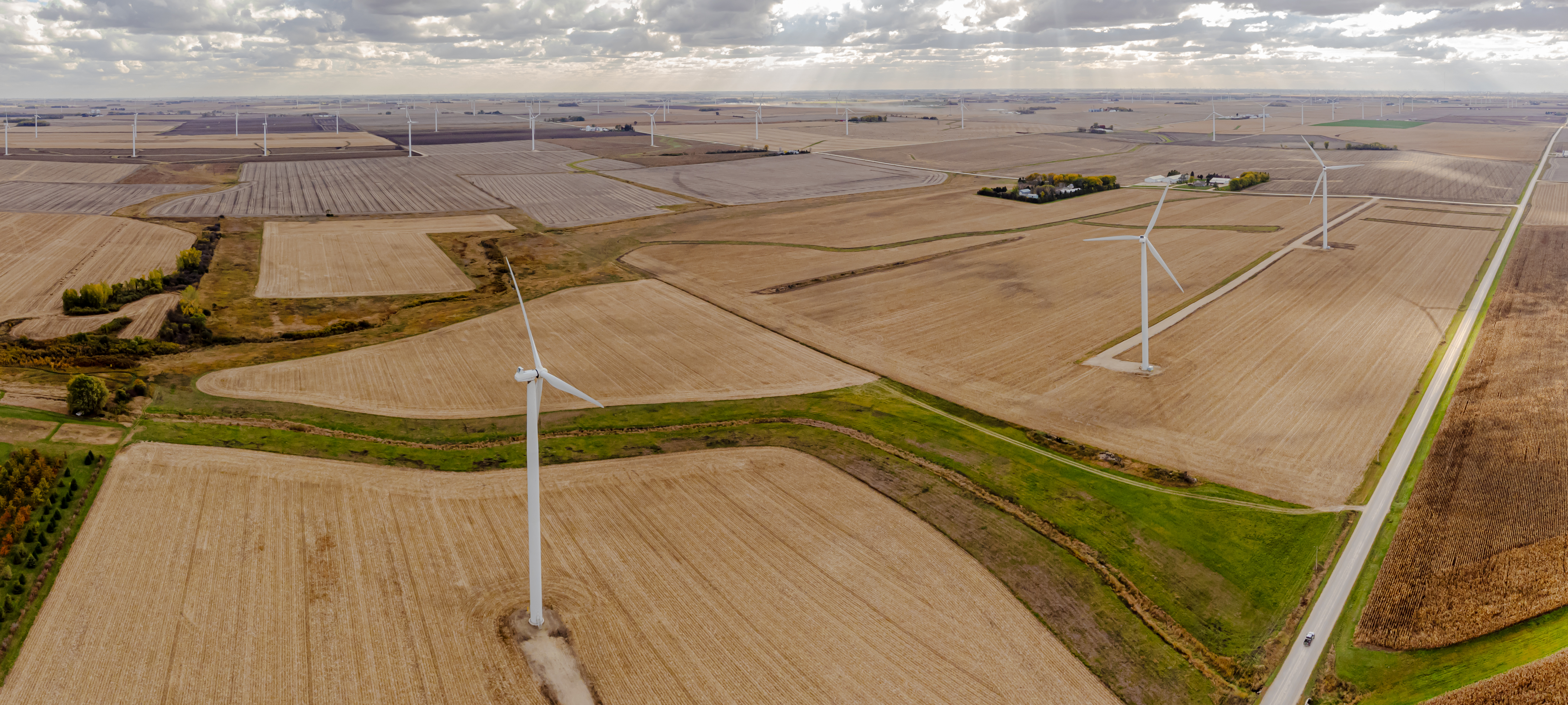
Northern Iowa wind farm Pioneer Prairie

In addition to federal programs, the state of Iowa encourages development of renewable electricity sources through a 1 cent per kilowatt hour tax credit. Also, generation equipment and facilities receive property tax breaks, and generation equipment is exempt from sales tax.

The development of wind power in Iowa began with the enactment in 1983 of a state law that required investor-owned utilities in the state to buy a total of 105 MW of power from wind generated electricity, one of the first renewable electricity portfolio standards. This provided assurance to those building wind power installations that there would be a market for the electricity they produced.

Iowa has the highest density of wind power generation capacity.

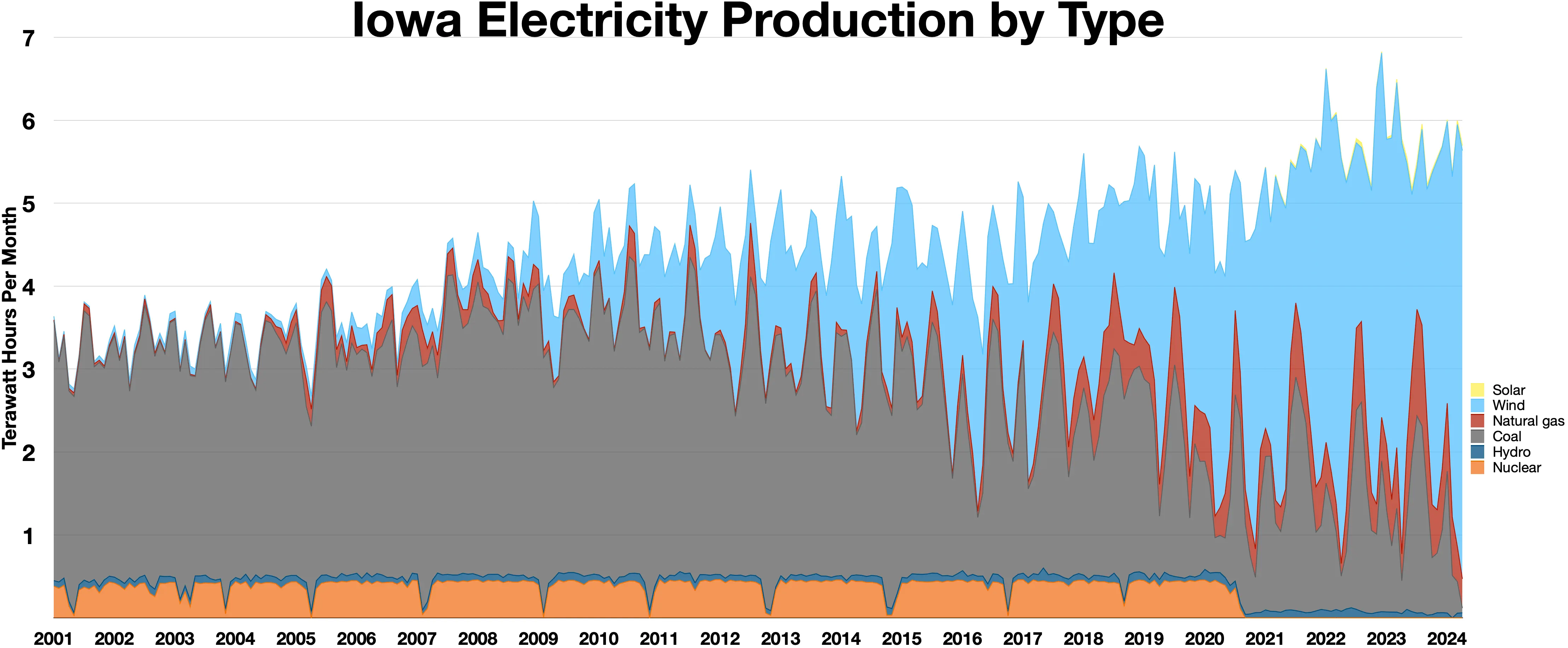
Iowa electricity production by type

In 2010 and in 2009, Iowa led the U.S. in the percentage of electrical power generated by wind, at 15.4 percent and 14.2 percent. This was up from 7.7 percent in 2008, as there was a large increase in the installed capacity in 2008. Some of the wind power generated electricity is sold to utility companies in nearby states, such as Wisconsin, and Illinois.

Wind farms are most prevalent in the north and west portion of Iowa. Wind maps show the winds in these areas to be stronger on average, making them better suited for the development of wind energy. Average wind speeds are not consistent from month to month. Wind maps show wind speeds are on average strongest from November through April, peaking in March. August is the month with the weakest average wind speeds. On a daily cycle, there is a slight rise in average wind speeds in the afternoon, from 1 to 6 p.m. Estimates by the National Renewable Energy Laboratory (NREL) indicate Iowa has potentially 570,700 Megawatts of wind power using large turbines mounted on 80 meter towers. Iowa ranks seventh in the country in terms of wind energy generation potential due to the strong average wind speeds in the midsection of the U.S. The Iowa Environmental Mesonet distributes current weather and wind conditions from approximately 450 monitoring stations across Iowa, providing data for modelling and predicting wind power.

The average capacity factor of Iowa wind farms has been estimated as 33.3% by a wind industry consultant. For newer installations, higher capacity factors, approaching 40%, have been stated. Production numbers for 2013, when wind capacity remained almost constant, showed a capacity factor over 34 percent. Due to these better wind conditions, Iowa generated more electricity from wind power in 2013 than California, even though it had less wind power capacity installed. And again in 2014 Iowa was number two in wind power generation behind only Texas.

Several of the newer projects are the large 500 MW Highland Wind Energy Center and the O'Brien Wind Farm in O'Brien County, and the Ida Wind farm in Ida county. These were constructed in 2015 and 2016.

According to the Iowa Office of Energy Independence, lack of transmission line capacity is beginning to restrict further growth of wind farms in the state. A report from the NREL acknowledges that this is a major hurdle to increased wind power development in the U.S. A high-voltage direct current line that would transmit power from near Sioux City to the Chicago area has been proposed.

MidAmerican Energy, in 2015, completed five projects in Iowa totaling over 1,000 MW of capacity. The projects are in O'Brien, Marshall, Webster, Grundy, and Madison counties. 448 wind turbines manufactured by Siemens are to be constructed. At a cost of some 1.9 billion dollars, this will be Iowa's largest economic development project to date. The largest project, the Highland Wind Energy Center in O'Brien county, has 500 MW of generation capacity, making it the state's largest.

In 2017, construction was started on the third wind farm of MidAmerican Energy's Wind XI project. The North English Wind farm in Poweshiek County will consist of 170 2.0 MW Vestas turbines. The project is scheduled to be completed at the end of 2018. Work on two other wind farms in the project, the Beaver Creek wind farm and the Prairie wind farm, is expected to be finished the end of 2017.

From October 23 to 24, 2017, wind power provided all the power consumed by MidAmerican Energy's Iowa customers. This was the first time wind generation reached this threshold, aided by sustained winds of 25 mph (40 km/h) with gusts to 40 mph (65 km/h). Over the calendar year 2022, MidAmerican produced more power from wind in Iowa than its Iowa customers consumed; this includes power exports when wind power exceeded demand, so non-renewable sources were needed when demand exceeded available wind power.

A new transmission line is being built to transmit some of the power from the Highland project to the Spencer and Iowa Great Lakes area. Additionally, power will be transmitted by an existing 345 kilovolt line running from south of Sioux City to Lakefield, Minnesota.

== Local industry ==
A number of companies involved in the wind power industry have offices or manufacturing facilities in Iowa. Blades for wind turbines are manufactured in Newton by TPI Composites and in Fort Madison by Siemens. Towers are also manufactured in Newton by Arcosa, a spinoff of Trinity Structural Towers. Companies manufacturing other parts for wind turbines are located in Iowa as well.

In addition to manufacturing, various companies support the development of wind power projects. The wind power industry employs 9,000 to 10,000 people in Iowa. Over $16 billion has been invested in Iowa's wind power projects and manufacturing facilities.

In late September 2007, Siemens Power Generation opened its new wind turbine blade factory in Fort Madison, on the banks of the Mississippi River. The factory can produce more than 2000 blades annually. A plant expansion in 2008 brought the facility up to nearly 600,000 square feet, up from 310,000. The facility manufactures 148-foot (45 m)-long, 12-ton blades for the company's 2.3-MW wind turbines installed in the United States.

The Iowa Office of Energy Independence (OEI) is tasked with determining policy and setting goals towards renewable energy production. The office seeks to coordinate efforts between industry, community leaders, state and local government, and educational institutions to achieve energy policy goals.

== Wind farms ==
Wind power projects in Iowa
Operating
Under construction

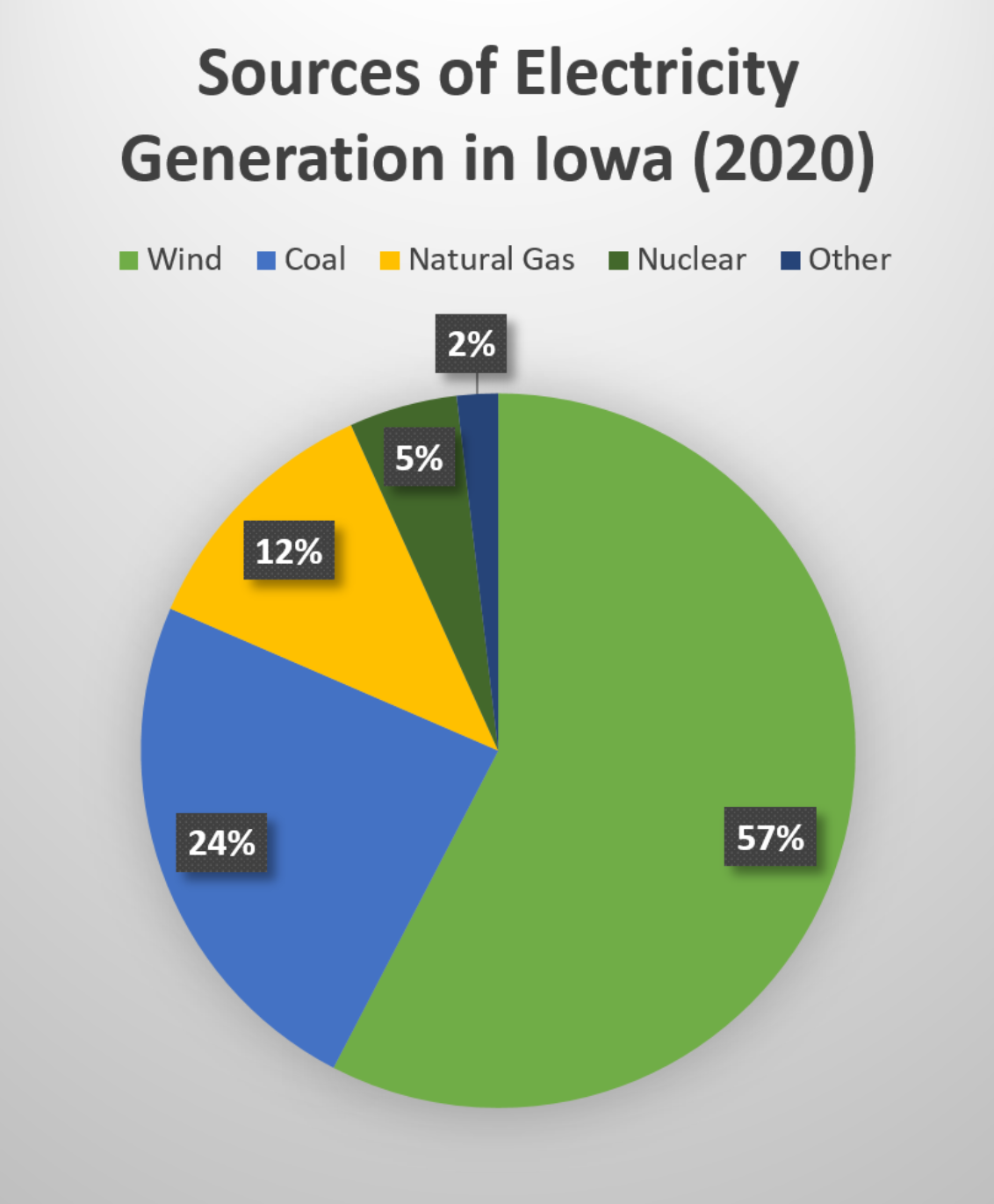
2020 electricity generation in Iowa by source

The following lists some of the wind projects in Iowa.

Name	Location
Intrepid	between Schaller and Storm Lake, north of U.S. 20
Highland	in O'Brien County
Rolling Hills	near Massena
Top of Iowa	near Joice, west of I-35
Story County I	north of Colo
Story County II	south of Humboldt, Story and Hardin counties
Pomeroy	between Pomeroy and Fonda, along Iowa 7
Endeavor	near Lake-Park, Harris along Iowa 9
Century	north of Blairsburg, along U.S. 69, west of I-35
Buena Vista	Alta, Peterson, Truesdale area
Victory	near Arcadia and Westside, U.S. 30
Carroll	northwest of Carroll, near Mt. Carmel & Breda
Hancock County	Klemme
Hardin Hilltop	north of Jefferson, 7 towers
Charles City	west of Charles City
Walnut	near Walnut (n.e. of Council Bluffs), mostly south of I-80
Whispering Willow Wind Farm	Franklin County, between Hampton and Iowa Falls
Adair	South of Adair, near I-80
Barton	near Kensett, east of I-35
Crystal Lake	between Buffalo Center and Crystal Lake, Hancock and Winnebago counties
Pioneer Prairie	Howard & Mitchell counties
Crosswind Energy	southeast of Ruthven, U.S. 18
Lost Lakes	West of Milford – Dickinson County
Iowa Lakes Superior	near Superior, U.S. 71
Iowa Lakes Lakota	near Lakota, Iowa 9
Laurel	west of Laurel
Rippey	between Rippey & Grand Jct
Vienna	south of Gladbrook
Beaver Creek	Boone and Greene counties
Prairie	Mahaska County

The Spirit, Endeavor, Buena Vista, Lost Lakes, and Crosswind Energy wind farms are all located upon the Coteau des Prairies, a slightly elevated area that results in the windiest locations in Minnesota and Iowa. Coteau des Prairies is sometimes referred to as Buffalo Ridge, which is actually a specific ridge within the area, mostly in Minnesota.

Power from the Iowa Lakes Superior and Iowa Lakes Lakota projects is used by ethanol fuel plants in their respective communities.

== Wind generation ==
- Teal background indicates wind was the largest source of generation that month.
- Green background indicates largest wind generation month to date.

Iowa wind generation (GWh, million kWh)
Year	Jan	Feb	Mar	Apr	May	Jun	Jul	Aug	Sept	Oct	Nov	Dec	Total	% of total production
2001	44	33	38	54	48	35	23	25	26	52	51	59	488	1.26%
2002	84	103	80	97	87	75	45	47	53	73	81	95	920	2.16%
2003	87	91	105	99	78	50	50	33	67	99	100	123	982	2.35%
2004	103	119	120	101	109	57	38	52	86	82	76	107	1,050	2.43%
2005	81	111	156	156	174	122	90	66	148	154	226	163	1,647	3.73%
2006	244	204	251	251	239	132	113	93	141	209	181	258	2,316	5.09%
2007	312	221	280	283	288	171	125	120	223	244	297	195	2,759	5.54%
2008	327	245	288	420	340	253	174	160	253	391	464	766	4,081	7.69%
2009	640	720	797	796	697	440	362	491	328	663	760	726	7,420	14.37%
2010	738	649	851	908	771	555	452	596	745	873	1,115	917	9,170	15.95%
2011	807	989	872	1,065	1,129	850	484	414	572	1,102	1,257	1,167	10,708	18.81%
2012	1,490	1,141	1,368	1,296	1,316	1,063	643	711	887	1,366	1,415	1,336	14,032	24.76%
2013	1,671	1,388	1,422	1,470	1,446	1,094	866	673	1,165	1,336	1,755	1,283	15,569	27.37%
2014	1,854	1,323	1,734	1,762	1,261	1,027	916	541	976	1,481	1,992	1,440	16,307	28.55%
2015	1,815	1,583	1,651	1,606	1,610	905	789	1,004	1,334	1,694	2,044	1,838	17,873	31.54%
2016	1,737	1,894	1,859	2,343	1,334	1,309	983	789	1,556	1,796	2,050	2,422	20,072	36.90%
2017	1,720	2,162	2,416	2,079	1,863	1,545	864	809	1,426	2,219	2,070	2,201	21,374	36.91%
2018	2,457	1,694	2,131	2,099	1,507	1,696	1,011	1,217	1,668	1,716	1,944	2,194	21,334	33.66%
2019	2,279	1,881	2,494	2,866	2,171	1,925	1,696	1,370	2,146	2,650	2,503	2,633	26,558	41.98%
2020	2,590	3,042	3,023	3,034	2,657	2,894	1,743	2,189	2,784	3,280	3,816	3,099	34,149	57.51%
2021	3,083	2,797	3,912	3,686	3,278	2,347	1,730	2,212	2,747	3,060	3,951	3,908	36,574	55.31%
2022	4501	4219	4687	4882	3946	3061	2233	2098	3087	3640	5011	4393	45,758	64.72%
2023	3658	4248	4327	5106	3401	1982	1550	2235	2829	4049	4198	3854	41,437	61.19%
2024	3365	4067	5038	5116	3577	3386	1986	2320	2985	4543	4041	3879	44,303	65.63%
2025	4683	4200	5064	4587	3244	2871	2094	1972	2204	4199	4034	4586	43,737	58.92%
2026	4238	3866												

Iowa wind generation in 2019

Iowa wind generation capacity by year

== See also ==
- Agrivoltaics
- Bifacial solar cells
- Horizontal axis solar trackers
- Solar power in Iowa
- Rock Island Clean Line
- Wind power in the United States
- Renewable energy in the United States
- Methanol economy
