= National Register of Historic Places listings in Mower County, Minnesota =

Location of Mower County in Minnesota

This is a complete list of the properties and districts on the National Register of Historic Places in Mower County, Minnesota, United States. The locations of National Register properties and districts for which the latitude and longitude coordinates are included below, may be seen in an online map.

There are 11 properties and districts listed on the National Register in the county.

This National Park Service list is complete through NPS recent listings posted January 9, 2026.

== Current listings ==
	Name on the Register	Image	Date listed	Location	City or town	Description
1	Booth Post No. 130-Grand Army of the Republic Hall	Booth Post No. 130-Grand Army of the Republic Hall	June 13, 1986 (#86001278)	S. Main St. between 1st and 2nd Sts. 43°42′15″N 92°34′23″W	Grand Meadow	Rare surviving example of an inexpensive pattern clubhouse and one of Minnesota's only two remaining Grand Army of the Republic halls, built in 1891.
2	Bridge No. 5388 (Bridge No. R0529)	Bridge No. 5388 (Bridge No. R0529)	June 26, 1998 (#98000718)	Spanning the Upper Iowa River on 130th Street; 43°31′56″N 92°31′07″W	Le Roy Township	Longest, most advanced example of the state's standardized Warren pony truss bridges, built in Meeker County in 1935, removed in 2009, and installed at current location in Lake Louise State Park in 2012.
3	Cook-Hormel House	Cook-Hormel House	August 19, 1982 (#82002989)	208 4th Ave. NW. 43°40′13″N 92°58′37″W	Austin	One of Austin's most distinctive houses, built in 1871 for mayor and businessman John Cook (1823–1892) and extensively remodeled in 1902 by Hormel Foods founder George A. Hormel (1860–1946). Now the Hormel Historic Home museum and event venue.
4	Exchange State Bank	Exchange State Bank	June 10, 1975 (#75000997)	105 Main St. N. 43°42′21″N 92°34′23″W	Grand Meadow	1910 Prairie School bank, the first major collaboration between architects William Gray Purcell and George Grant Elmslie and the prototype of a string of such buildings designed by their firm.
5	First National Bank of Adams	First National Bank of Adams	March 20, 1986 (#86000442)	322 Main St. 43°33′56″N 92°43′09″W	Adams	The last of four small Prairie School banks designed by Purcell & Elmslie, built in 1924. Also noted for an interior mural by artist John W. Norton (1876–1934). Now the Adams Area History Center.
6	First State Bank of Le Roy	First State Bank of Le Roy	March 20, 1986 (#86000445)	102 W. Main St. 43°30′36″N 92°30′14″W	Le Roy	Purcell & Elmslie's smallest Prairie School bank, built in 1914 with innovations inspired by a very limited budget.
7	Freund Store	Freund Store	April 24, 1986 (#86000867)	County Highway 7; 43°30′19″N 92°46′08″W	Johnsburg	1895 general store with an upper-level meeting hall and attached residence; the community's commercial and social hub through three generations of family ownership until 1967.
8	Grand Meadow Quarry Archeological District	Grand Meadow Quarry Archeological District	April 8, 1994 (#94000345)	25578 730th Ave. 43°43′40″N 92°35′19″W	Grand Meadow vicinity	Various chert quarrying sites used to make stone tools c. 8000 BCE–1600 CE.
9	LeRoy Public Library	LeRoy Public Library	March 20, 1986 (#86000447)	605 N. Broadway; 43°30′41″N 92°30′14″W	Le Roy	1915 Neoclassical library, Mower County's only intact example in the Carnegie library vein, though founded in this case through the grassroots efforts of a local women's club.
10	Paramount Theater	Paramount Theater	October 23, 1986 (#86002906)	125 4th Ave. NE. 43°40′13″N 92°58′25″W	Austin	1929 movie theater, the only atmospheric theater and commercial use of Spanish Colonial Revival architecture in Mower County, and a unique work of Ellerbe & Co.
11	Arthur W. Wright House	Arthur W. Wright House	March 20, 1986 (#86000441)	300 4th Ave. NW. 43°40′13″N 92°58′39″W	Austin	House built sometime between 1866 and 1874; the earliest and most intact example of Italianate architecture in Mower County.

== See also ==
- List of National Historic Landmarks in Minnesota
- National Register of Historic Places listings in Minnesota
