= List of power stations in Iowa =

Sources of Iowa utility-scale electricity generation in gigawatt-hours, full-year 2025:
1. Wind: 43,738 (58.9%)
2. Coal: 19,108 (25.7%)
3. Natural gas: 8,688 (11.7%)
4. Solar: 1,299 (1.75%)
5. Hydroelectric: 1,135 (1.53%)
6. Biomass: 196 (0.26%)
7. Petroleum: 68 (0.09%)

This is a list of electricity-generating power stations in the U.S. state of Iowa, sorted by type and name. In 2024, Iowa had a total summer capacity of 23.2 GW through all of its power plants, and a net generation of 70,464 GWh. In 2025, the electrical energy generation mix was 58.9% wind, 25.7% coal, 11.7% natural gas, 1.8% solar, 1.5% hydroelectric, 0.3% biomass, and 0.1% petroleum. Small-scale solar, which includes customer-owned photovoltaic panels, delivered 552 GWh to the state's electrical grid in 2025.

Iowa has been among the top-five energy-consuming states, due in large part to its productive agriculture industry. State regulators implemented the nation's first renewable portfolio standard (RPS) applied to investor-owned utilities in 1983. The modest goal of 105 MW was soon met, and was exceeded nearly 100 times over by the end of 2019. All electrical utility customers have had the option to support further expansion of renewable generation since 2004, and regulators have also taken steps to encourage greater efficiency of energy use. Iowa has produced more electricity than it has consumed since 2008.

During 2019, wind power from about 5,100 turbines (10,200 MW) throughout Iowa generated 41% of electricity, which was the highest share among the United States. Wind is a durable resource year-round and throughout the state, and trends mildest during summer months and in southeastern regions. The historic 142 MW Keokuk hydroelectric station on the Mississippi River is Iowa's longest serving facility since 1913.

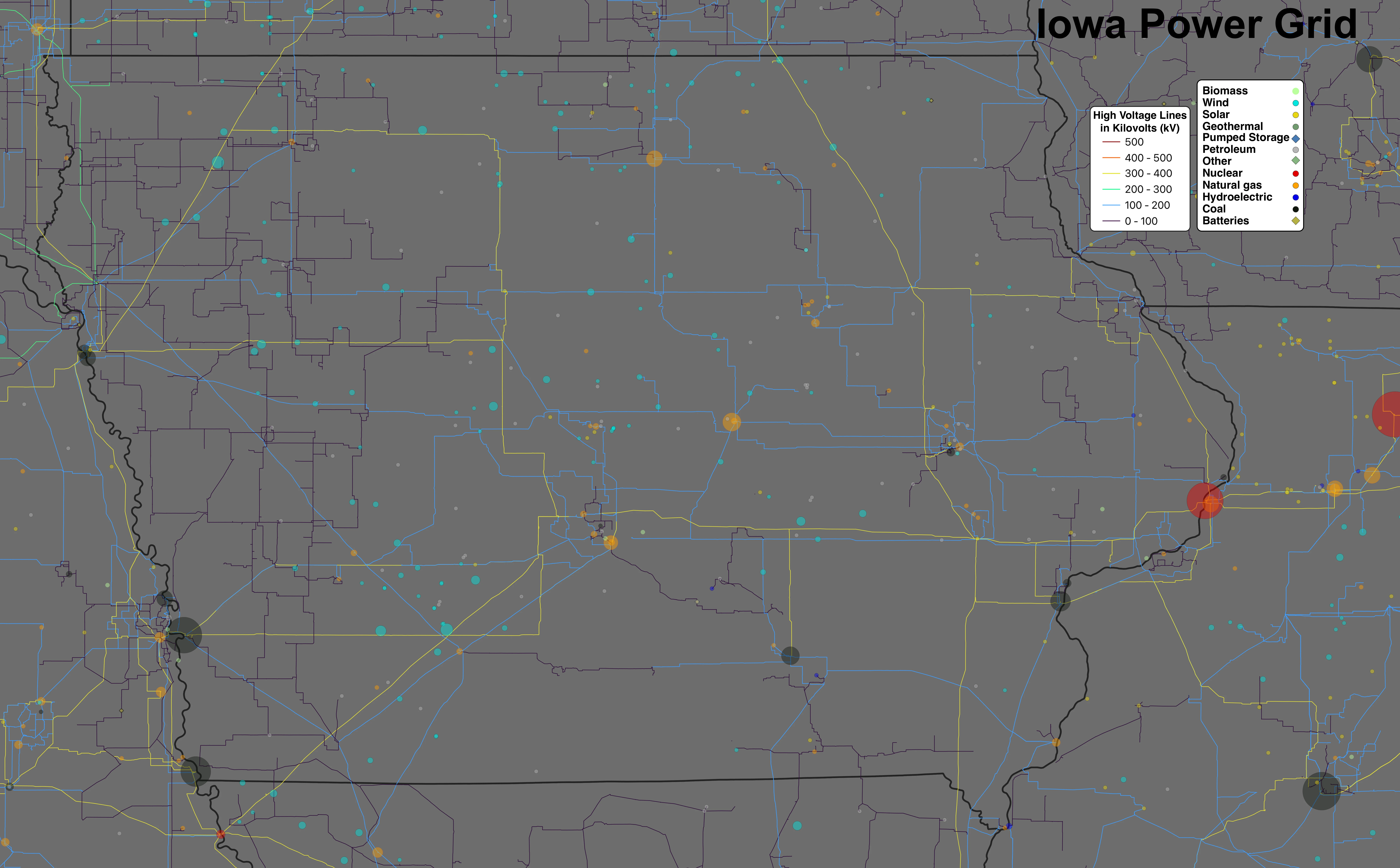
Iowa power grid

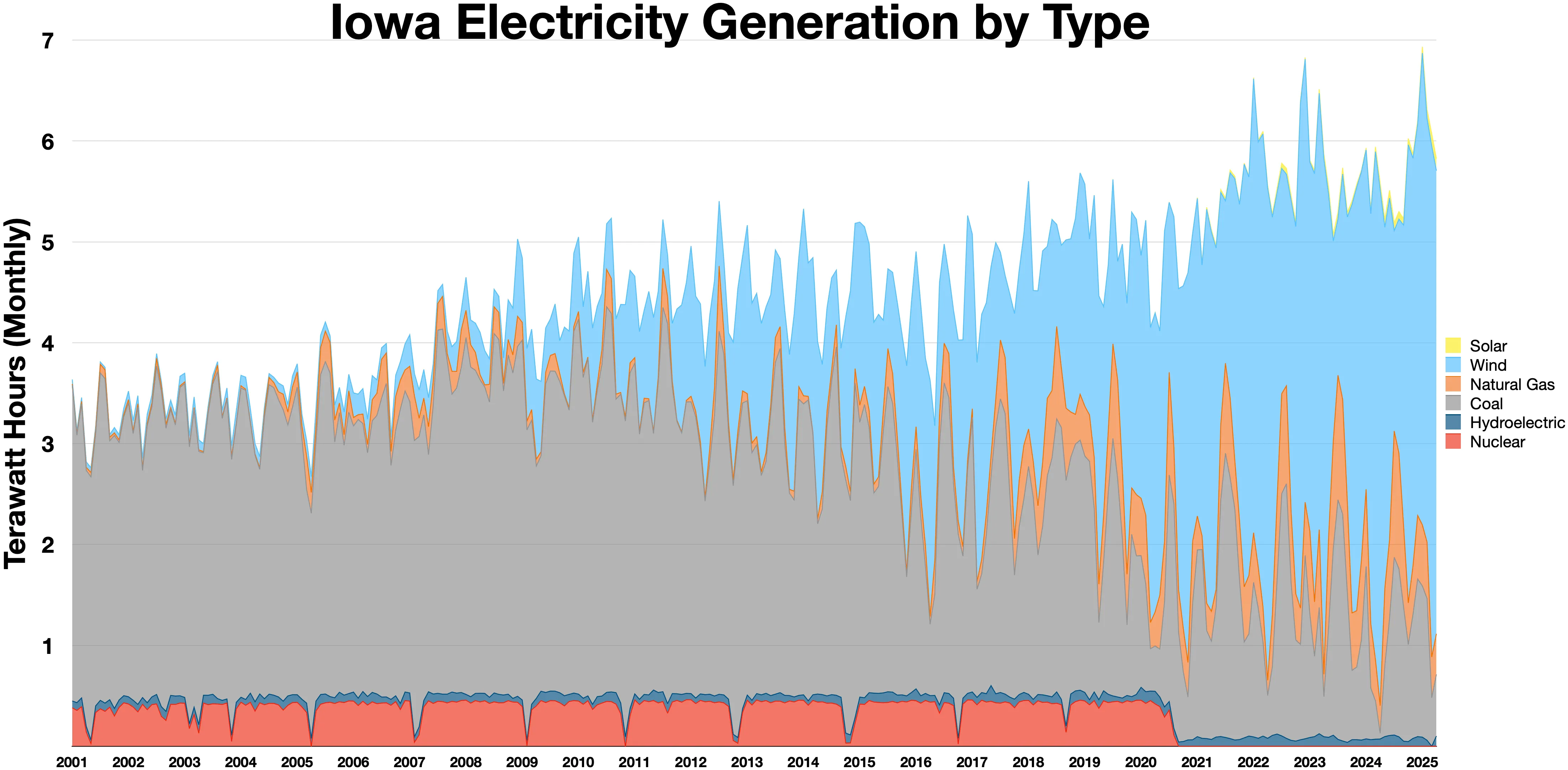
Iowa electricity generation by type

== Nuclear power stations ==
Name	Location	Coordinates	Capacity (MW)	Refs	Year opened	Note
Duane Arnold Energy Center (DAEC)	Linn County	42.1011°N 91.7781°W	680		1975	retired in 2020, solar farm proposed for site

== Fossil-fuel power stations ==
Data from the U.S. Energy Information Administration serves as a general reference.

=== Coal-fired plants ===
A useful map of active and retiring coal generation plants is provided by the Sierra Club.

Name	Location	Coordinates	Summer capacity (MW)	Refs	Year opened	Note
ADM Cedar Rapids Power Plant	Linn County	41.9221°N 91.6875°W	295		1988	capacity increased until 2000. includes a 35MW natural gas turbine added 2016.
ADM Clinton Power Plant	Clinton County	41.8206°N 90.2097°W	180		2009	
George Neal Energy Center	Woodbury County	42.2998°N 96.3617°W	1140		1975 (Unit 3); 1979 (Unit 4)	Units 1&2 retired in 2016
Lansing Generating Station	Allamakee County	43.3359°N 91.1675°W	250		1977	closed
Louisa Generating Station	Louisa County	41.3181°N 91.0931°W	750		1983	
Muscatine Generating Station	Muscatine County	41.3917°N 91.0569°W	225		1958	capacity increased until 2000
Ottumwa Generating Station	Wapello County	41.0961°N 92.5558°W	725		1981	
Walter Scott Jr. Energy Center	Pottawattamie County	41.1800°N 95.8408°W	1650		1978 (Unit 3); 2007 (Unit 4)	Units 1&2 retired in 2015

=== Natural gas-fired plants ===
Many generating stations fueled by gas in Iowa are peaker plants that use simple cycle combustion turbines (SCCT). Combined cycle combustion turbines (CCCT) and steam turbines (ST) alone may also be used for base load or peaking generation.

Name	Location	Coordinates	Summer capacity (MW)	Refs	Type	Year opened	Note
Ames Steam Turbine	Story County	42.0258°N 93.6089°W	95		ST	1968	63MW added 1982
Burlington Generating Station	Des Moines County	40.7412°N 91.1167°W	245			1968	Coal retirement in 2021. Includes 47MW natural gas. Turbines added 1996–1998.
Coralville Gas Turbine	Johnson County	41.6719°N 91.5640°W	66		SCCT	1970	
Earl F. Wisdom Station	Clay County	43.1606°N 95.2569°W	113		ST; SCCT	1960 (ST); 2004 (SCCT)	38MW ST; 76MW SCCT
Electrifarm Power Plant	Black Hawk County	42.4407°N 92.4205°W	183		SCCT	1975 (Unit 1); 1978 (Units 2&3)	
Emery Generating Station	Cerro Gordo County	43.0940°N 93.2922°W	535		CCCT	2004	
Exira Station	Audubon County	41.5144°N 94.9197°W	140		SCCT	2004 (Units 1&2); 2007 (Unit 3)	
Greater Des Moines Energy Center	Polk County	41.5563°N 93.5283°W	485		CCCT	2004	
Marshalltown Generating Station	Marshall County	42.0433°N 92.8728°W	820		SCCT; CCCT	1978 (SCCT); 2007 (CCCT)	170MW SCCT; 650MW CCCT
Pleasant Hill Gas Turbine	Polk County	41.5572°N 93.5242°W	156		SCCT	1990 (Units 1&2); 1994 (Unit 3)	
Prairie Creek Generating Station	Linn County	41.9440°N 91.6391°W	142		ST	1967	includes 29MW coal-fired capacity opened 1958
River Hills Gas Turbine	Polk County	41.5902°N 93.6195°W	118		SCCT	1966-1968	
Riverside Gas Turbine	Scott County	41.5400°N 90.4481°W	114		ST	1961	
Sycamore Gas Turbine	Polk County	41.6722°N 93.6769°W	144		SCCT	1974	

== Renewable power stations ==
Data from the U.S. Energy Information Administration serves as a general reference.

=== Biomass ===
Name	Location	Coordinates	Capacity (MW)	Refs	Fuel	Year opened	Note
AgriReNew	Scott County	41.6919°N 90.8664°W	1.0		biomass methane	2013	gas turbine
Davenport Water Pollution Control	Scott County	41.4928°N 90.6275°W	1.6		wastewater methane	1995	
Des Moines Wastewater Reclamation	Polk County	41.5734°N 93.5577°W	2.8		wastewater methane	1991	facility upgrades 2015, 2020
Lake Mills Gas Recovery	Winnebago County	43.3864°N 93.5589°W	4.0		landfill gas	2006	
Metro Methane Recovery	Polk County	41.5989°N 93.3550°W	11.2		landfill gas	1998	4.8MW added 2014

=== Hydroelectric plants ===
Name	Location	Coordinates	Capacity (MW)	Refs	Year opened	Note
5 in 1 Dam Hydro Plant	Linn County	42.0750°N 91.6023°W	2.1		1986	damaged in 2008 flood
Keokuk Energy Center	Lee County	40.3965°N 91.3719°W	142		1913	
Maquoketa Hydro Plant	Jackson County	42.0700°N 90.6977°W	1.2		1924	
Ottumwa Hydro Plant	Wapello County	41.0163°N 92.4149°W	3.2		1931	
Red Rock Hydroelectric Project	Marion County	41.3697°N 92.9802°W	43.2		2021	

=== Wind farms ===
Name	Location	Coordinates	Capacity (MW)	Refs	Year opened	Note
Adair Wind Farm	Adair County	41°28′N 94°38′W	175		2008	
Adams Wind Farm	Adams County	40°55′N 94°40′W	154		2015	
Arbor Hill Wind Farm	Adair County	41°21′N 94°29′W	250		2018	
Barton Wind Farm	Worth County	43°23′N 93°05′W	160		2009	
Beaver Creek Wind Farm I & II	Boone County; Greene County	42°02′N 94°02′W	340		2017/2018	
Carol Wind Farm	Carol County	42°10′N 94°56′W	159		2008	
Century Wind Farm	Wright County; Hamilton County	42°30′N 93°38′W	201		2005/2007	
Crystal Lake Wind Farm I, II, III	Winnebago County; Hancock County	43°14′N 93°50′W	416		2008/2009	
Diamond Trail Wind Farm	Iowa County	41°41′N 92°04′W	252		2020	
Eclipse Wind Project	Audubon County; Guthrie County	41°41′N 94°45′W	200		2012	
Endeavor Wind Farm I & II (Osceola Wind)	Osceola County	43°26′N 95°25′W	148		2008	
English Farms Wind	Poweshiek County	41°34′N 92°24′W	172		2019	
Garden Wind Farm	Hardin County	42°13′N 93°22′W	150		2009	
Glaciers Edge Wind	Cherokee County	42°52′N 95°46′W	200		2019	
Golden Plains Wind Farm	Kossuth County; Winnebago County	43°26′N 94°01′W	200		2020	
Heartland Divide II	Audubon County	41.7588°N 94.7951°W	200		2022	
Highland Wind Energy Center	O'Brien County	43°05′N 95°34′W	502		2015	
Ida Grove Wind Farm I & II	Ida County	42°16′N 95°28′W	503		2016/2019	
Intrepid Wind Farm	Buena Vista County	42°33′N 95°20′W	175		2004/2005	
Kossuth Wind Farm	Kossuth County		150		2020	
Lundgren Wind Farm	Webster County	42°17′N 93°52′W	251		2014	
North English Wind Farm I & II	Poweshiek County	41°41′N 92°32′W	340		2018/2019	
O'Brien Wind Farm	O'Brien County	43°12′N 95°38′W	250		2016	
Orient Wind Farm	Adair County	41°12′N 94°25′W	501		2018/2019	
Palo Alto Wind Farm I & II	Palo Alto County	43°05′N 94°41′W	340		2019/2020	
Pioneer Prairie Wind Farm	Mitchell County; Howard County	43°28′N 92°35′W	293		2008	
Pomeroy Wind Farm	Pocahontas County; Calhoun County	42°35′N 94°43′W	296		2007/2008	
Prairie Wind	Mahaska County	41°26′N 92°42′W	168		2018	
Rolling Hills Wind Farm	Adair County; Adams County; Cass County	41°18′N 94°47′W	444		2011	
Southern Hills Wind Farm	Adair County; Adams County; Union County	41°04′N 94°23′W	254		2020	
Storm Lake Wind Farm (Buena Vista Wind)	Buena Vista County	42°46′N 95°24′W	185		1999	
Story County Wind Farm I & II	Story County	42°04′N 93°19′W	300		2008/2009	
Top of Iowa Wind Farm I, II, III	Worth County	43°05′N 93°25′W	190		2007/2008	
Turtle Creek Wind Farm	Mitchell County	43°22′N 92°47′W	200		2018	
Upland Prairie Wind Farm	Clay County	43°12′N 95°21′W	299		2019	
Vienna Wind Farm	Marshall County	42°10′N 92°47′W	150		2012/2013	
Walnut Wind Farm	Pottawattamie County	41°27′N 95°14′W	165		2008	
Wellsburg Wind Project	Grundy County	42°23′N 92°58′W	141		2014	
Whispering Willow Wind Farm; East & North	Franklin County	42°37′N 93°18′W; 42°46′N 93°25′W	400		2009/2020	

=== Solar farms ===
Project name	Location	Coordinates	Capacity (MW_{AC})	Refs.	Year opened	Note
Bloomfield Solar	Davis County	40.7500°N 92.4500°W	1.6		2019	
Cedar Falls Solar	Blackhawk County	42.4814°N 92.4582°W	1.5		2016	
Decorah DPC Solar (Madison Solar)	Winneshiek County	43°16′30″N 91°56′15″W	1.5		2019	
Downtown Dubuque Solar Garden	Dubuque County	42.5080°N 90.6585°W	.9		2017	
Eastern Iowa Solar	Muscatine County	41.5970°N 91.0363°W	1.8		2016	
Forest City Solar	Winnebago County	43.2760°N 93.6290°W	3.0		2019	
Marshalltown GS Solar	Marshall County	42.0430°N 92.8730°W	2.0		2020	
South Sioux City Solar	Dakota County	42.4585°N 96.4397°W	2.3		2017	
Southwestern Solar	Adams County	40°58′42″N 94°43′57″W	2.0		2018	
Strawberry Point DPC Solar	Clayton County	42.6786°N 91.5452°W	1.3		2017	
SunSmart Ames	Story County	42.0035°N 93.6170°W	2.0		2020	
West Dubuque Solar	Dubuque County	42.4918°N 90.7922°W	3.5		2017	
