= Highland Wind Energy Center =

Wind farm in Iowa, USA

Highland Wind Project
- Country: United States
- Location: O'Brien County, Iowa
- Coordinates: 43°05′N 95°34′W
- Status: Operational
- Construction began: 2013
- Commission date: 2015
- Construction cost: about $1 billion
- Owner: MidAmerican Energy Company
- Operator: MidAmerican Energy Company

Wind farm
- Type: Onshore

Power generation
- Units operational: 218
- Make and model: Siemens 2.3 MW
- Nameplate capacity: 501.4 MW
- Capacity factor: 38.6% (average 2016-2018)
- Annual net output: 1,694 GW·h

The Highland Wind Energy Center is a 501.4 megawatt (MW) wind farm in O'Brien County, Iowa. It became the largest facility in the state when it was placed online in 2015.

== Facility details ==
The facility is part of $1.9 billion in wind power project announced by MidAmerican Energy in 2013. It was the largest project in the world to be built in a single construction phase. Siemens supplied 218 2.3 MW wind turbines for the facility.

The facility is located at the southern end of Buffalo Ridge. The Rock Island Clean Line HVDC transmission line was proposed to originate just north of the project.

An expansion of the project, formerly known as Highland II was developed by Invenergy. This expansion was purchased by MidAmerican Energy and constructed in 2016 as the 250 MW O'Brien Wind Farm. It also lies in O'Brien county, just to the north of the Highland project.

== Electricity production ==
Highland Wind Energy Center Electricity Generation (MW·h)
| Year | Total Annual MW·h |
|---|---|
| 2015 | 549,863 |
| 2016 | 1,809,682 |
| 2017 | 1,726,146 |
| 2018 | 1,545,240 |
| Average (years 2016–2018) ---> | 1,693,689 |

== See also ==
- Wind power in Iowa
- List of wind farms in the United States
