= Johnsburg =

Johnsburg may refer to some places in the United States:

- Johnsburg, Illinois, the most populous Johnsburg in the US
- Johnsburg, Indiana
- Johnsburg, Minnesota
- Johnsburg, New York
- Johnsburg, Wisconsin
