= MidAmerican Energy Adventure Tower =

Observation tower in Council Bluffs, Iowa, U.S.

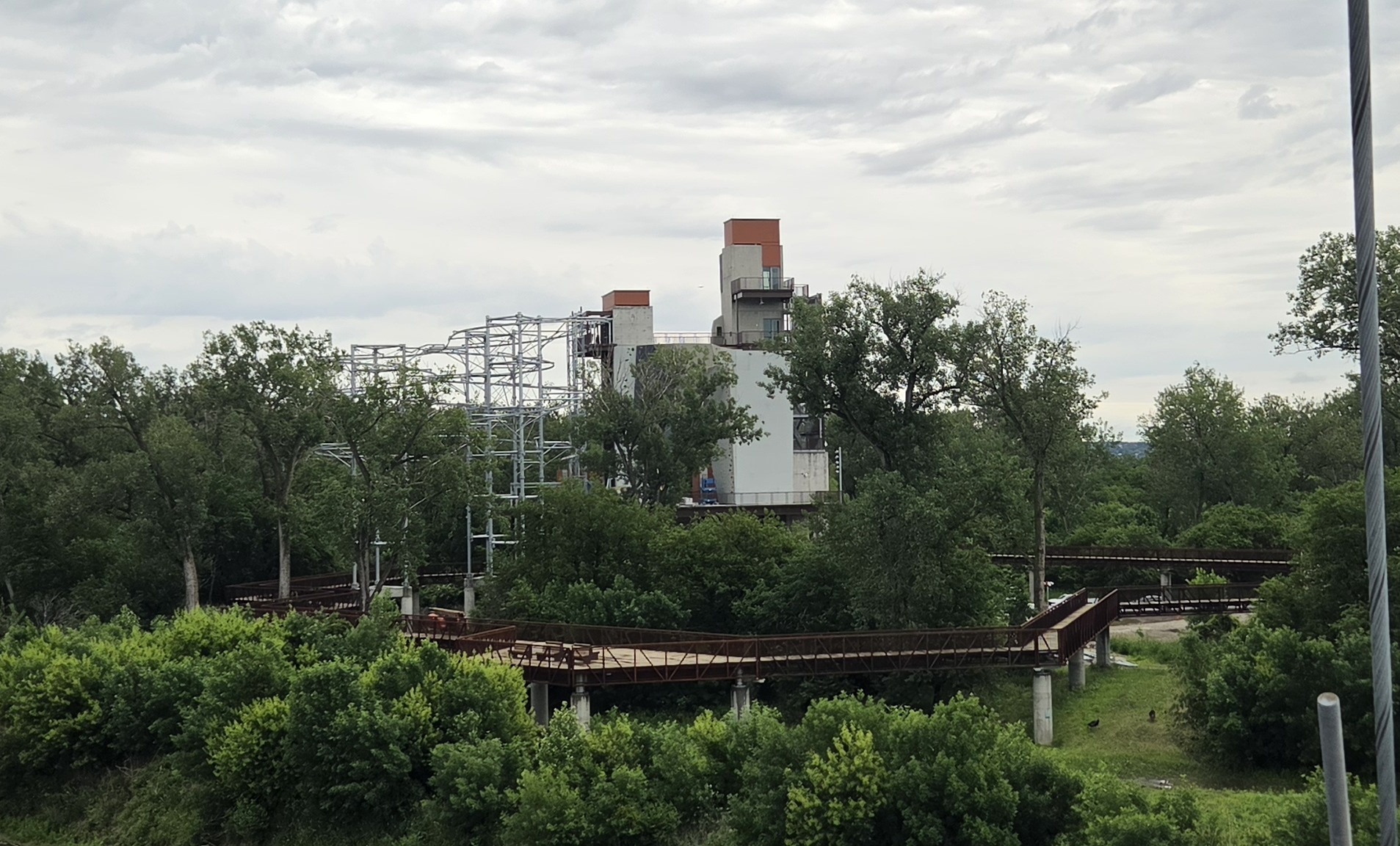
- Mid-American Energy Adventure Tower under construction in May 2026
- Interactive map of the MidAmerican Energy Adventure Tower area

General information
- Status: Under construction
- Type: Observation tower
- Location: Council Bluffs, Iowa, U.S.
- Coordinates: 41.265871130035045°N 95.91932126108702°W
- Construction started: 2025
- Completed: 2026 (planned)

Height
- Height: 138 feet (42 m)

Design and construction
- Developer: Southwest Iowa Nonprofit for Colletive Impact

MidAmerican Energy Adventure Tower is an under construction observation tower in Council Bluffs, Iowa. The tower is a major development in the Tom Hanafan River's Edge Park. The tower began construction in 2025, will reach an estimated height of 138 feet (42 m) and is expected to be completed in 2026.

== History ==
MidAmerican Energy Adventure Tower began development in the late 2010s as one of the construction phases of Tom Hanafan River's Edge Park. In 2022, the project was officially announced by its developer, Southwest Iowa Nonprofit for Collective Impact. Construction was intended to begin in September 2024. However, construction was delayed due to flooding. Construction began in early 2025 and the building is expected to be completed in 2026.

== Design ==
MidAmerican Energy Adventure Tower will be 138 feet (42 m) tall and will be a part of River's Edge Park. The tower is planned to have multiple platforms at various levels to allow visitors to view over the skyline. Additionally, it will have an, "adventure course," that will feature a climbing wall, simulated caving experiences, and a roll-glide ride. The tower will also accommodate for flooding conditions. The tower is named after MidAmerican Energy Company, based in Des Moines, Iowa.
