= Solar power in Iowa =

Overview of solar power in the U.S. state of Iowa

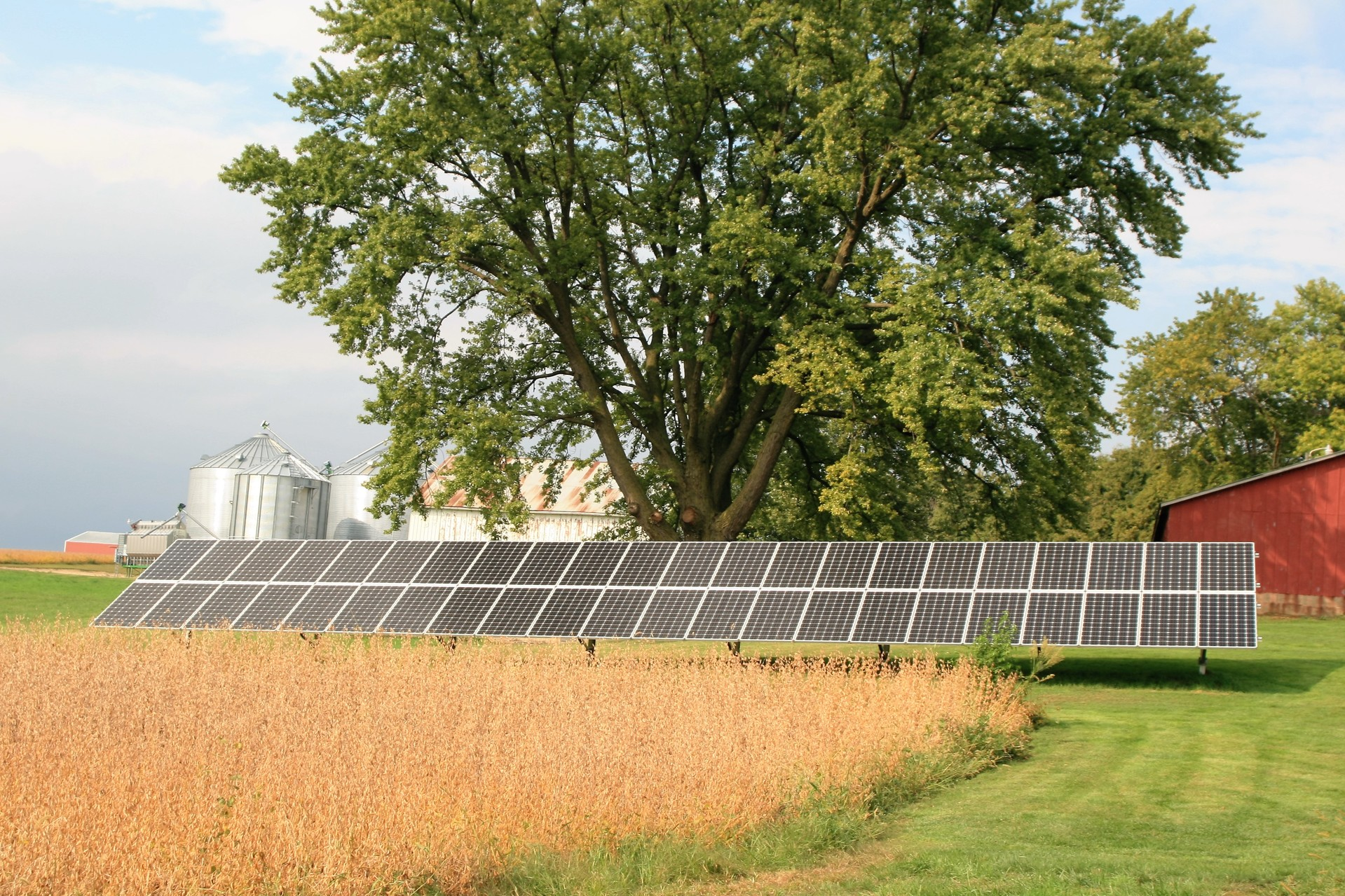
Solar installation on a farm in Iowa

Solar power in Iowa is limited but growing, with 137 megawatts (MW) installed by the end of 2019 and 27 MW installed during that year, ranking the state 40th among U.S. states. Iowa also generated 0.23% of the state's total electricity production in 2019 from solar energy; an amount sufficient to power over 17,000 Iowa homes. The state's early position as a major wind-power provider may have limited early large-scale solar investment.

Solar panels on rooftops alone can provide 20% of all electricity used in Iowa. On June 7, 2012, Sky Factory in Fairfield became the first company in the state to generate all of their electricity from solar power, with the installation of a 54 kilowatt (kW) 3500 sq. ft. solar array. Prior to that, one of the largest arrays was the 15.75 kW array on the Marshalltown Public Library. As of 2020, a 3.8 MW array near Dubuque is the state's largest facility. By 2024, another 380 MW of generating capacity may be installed according to projections by the Solar Energy Industries Association.

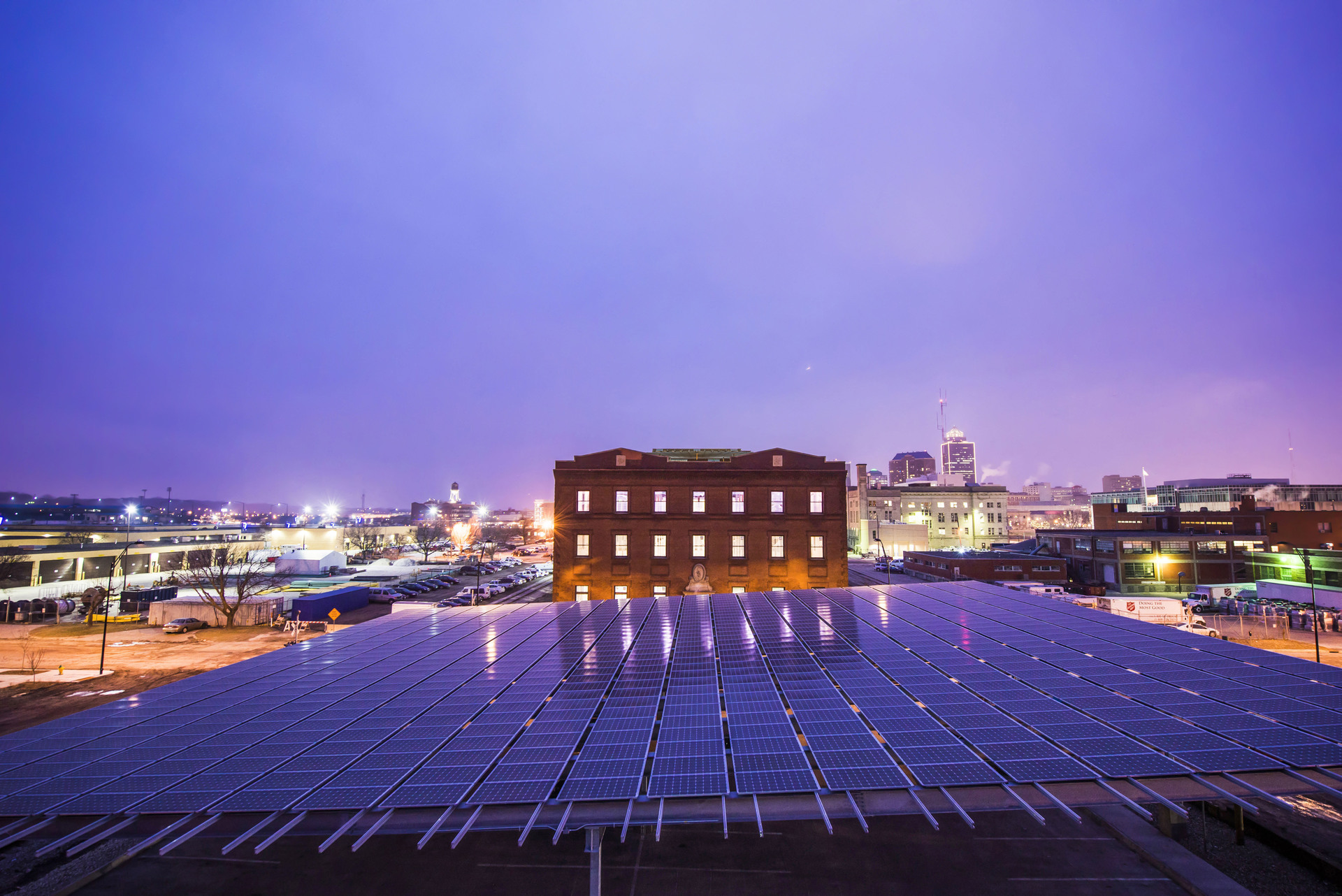
Solar roof, Des Moines

Net metering is available continuously to all consumers generating up to 500 kW, one of the best policies in the country, but is given a B-grade overall because of not being available to higher-consumption users. A feed-in tariff is available for customers of the Farmers Electrical Cooperative for up to 25% of their electricity. It pays 20 cents/kWh for electricity generated, none of which can be directly used since a separate meter is required, in a parallel connection, making it a power purchase agreement instead of a feed-in tariff. The state of Iowa has proposed a feed-in tariff, in Senate Bill SF 225. A separate rate applies for systems less than 20 kW and for systems more than 20 kW up to 20 MW.

== Currently operating (Note: As of December 31, 2025) ==
Solar Facilities in Iowa
#	Plant Name	Utility Name	County	Capacity (MW)	Operating Year
1	Arbor Hill Solar	MidAmerican Energy Co	Adair	25.0	2022
2	Bloomfield Municipal Utilities Solar	Onsite Partners, LLC	Davis	1.6	2019
3	Cedar Falls Solar Farm	Altus Power America Management, LLC	Black Hawk	1.5	2016
4	Cedar Rapids Community Solar	Interstate Power and Light Co	Linn	4.5	2024
5	Clinton Schools	Interstate Power and Light Co	Clinton	1.3	2025
6	Creston School Customer Hosted Solar	Interstate Power and Light Co	Union	1.4	2025
7	Creston Solar (50 MW)	Interstate Power and Light Co	Union	50.0	2024
8	DPC Madison	SoCore Energy LLC	Winneshiek	1.5	2019
9	Douglas (IA)	OneEnergy, Inc.	Mitchell	2.5	2025
10	Eastern Iowa Solar	Central Iowa Power Cooperative	Muscatine	1.8	2016
11	Fareway Customer Hosted 1 MW Solar	Interstate Power and Light Co	Boone	1.0	2024
12	Forest City Solar	Green Street Power Partners	Winnebago	3.0	2019
13	Franklin County Solar	MidAmerican Energy Co	Franklin	7.0	2022
14	Grinnell College	Azimuth 180 Solar Electric, LLC	Poweshiek	3.9	2024
15	Grinnell Customer Hosted Solar	Interstate Power and Light Co	Poweshiek	5.0	2025
16	Holliday Creek Solar	MidAmerican Energy Co	Webster	100.0	2022
17	Hy-Vee Customer Hosted 2.25MW Solar	Interstate Power and Light Co	Lucas	2.3	2024
18	IA - City of Ames - Airport Road	Forefront Power, LLC	Story	2.0	2020
19	ISU Customer Hosted 1MW Solar Project	Interstate Power and Light Co	Story	1.4	2024
20	Indianola Solar	SE Municipal Iowa, LLC	Warren	3.4	2025
21	Johnson County Hills Solar	MidAmerican Energy Co	Johnson	3.0	2022
22	Little Cedar	OneEnergy, Inc.	Mitchell	2.5	2025
23	Maple City	Altus Power America Management, LLC	Mitchell	1.5	2022
24	Marshalltown Generating Station	Interstate Power and Light Co	Marshall	2.6	2020
25	Neal Energy Center Solar	MidAmerican Energy Co	Woodbury	4.0	2022
26	Osage (IA)	City of Osage - (IA)	Mitchell	0.8	2016
27	Perry Customer Hosted 1MW Solar Project	Interstate Power and Light Co	Dallas	1.0	2024
28	Pleasant Creek Unit 1	Interstate Power and Light Co	Linn	50.0	2024
29	Pleasant Creek Unit 2	Interstate Power and Light Co	Linn	150.0	2024
30	REG Mason City Solar	REG Mason City, LLC	Cerro Gordo	2.6	2024
31	State Center	City of State Center - (IA)	Marshall	0.8	2017
32	Strawberry Point DPC Solar	SoCore Energy LLC	Clayton	1.3	2017
33	Wapello Solar LLC	Wapello Solar LLC	Louisa	100.0	2021
34	Waterloo Solar (IA)	MidAmerican Energy Co	Black Hawk	3.0	2022
35	Waverly Solar - (IA)	SE Municipal Iowa, LLC	Bremer	3.6	2025
36	West Dubuque Solar	Interstate Power and Light Co	Dubuque	3.8	2017
37	Wever Solar (150MW)	Interstate Power and Light Co	Lee	150.0	2024

== Statistics ==
Source: NREL

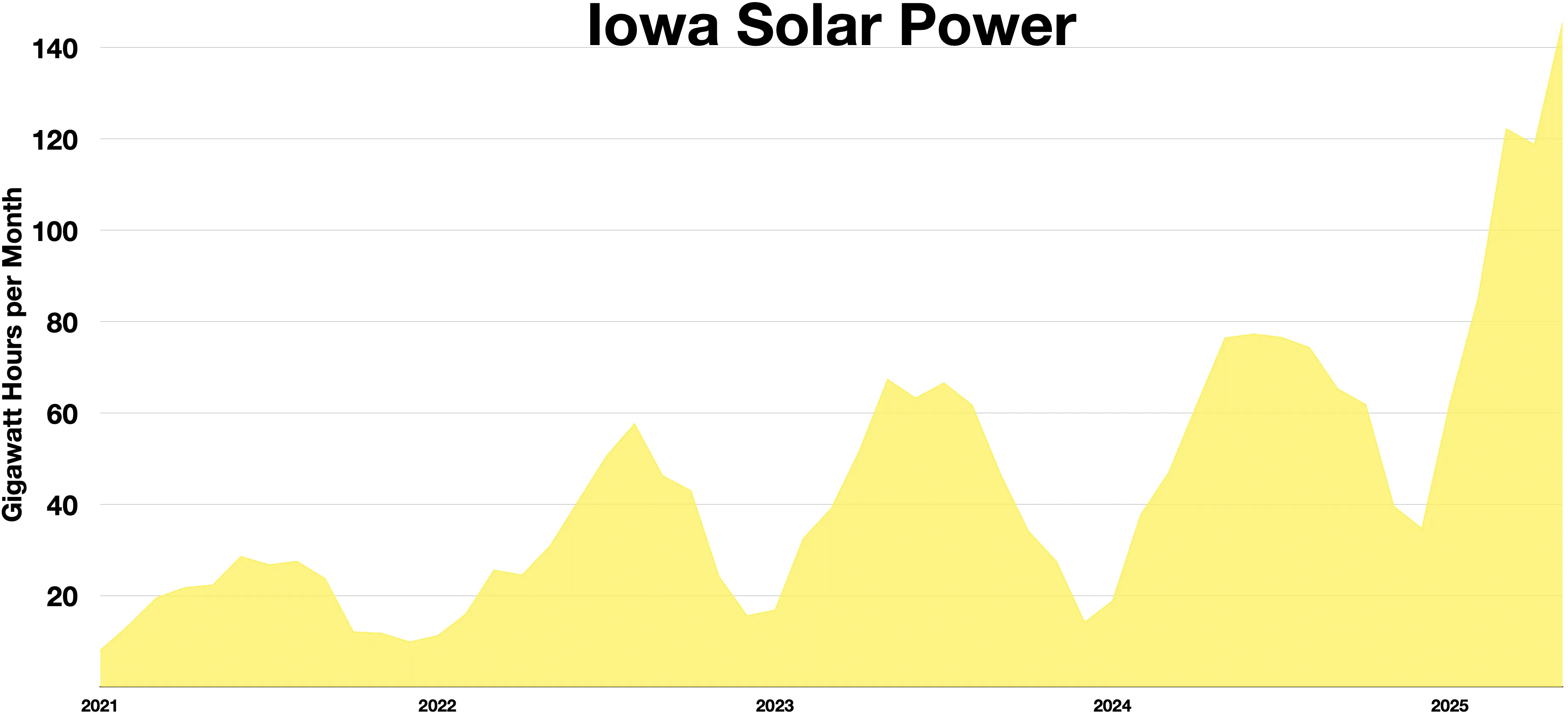
Iowa solar power 2021–2025

Iowa grid-connected PV capacity (MW)
Year	Capacity	Change	% change
2010	<0.1	-	-
2011	0.1	<0.1	-
2012	1.2	1.1	1100%
2013	4.6	3.4	283%
2014	21	16.4	356%
2015	27	6	29%
2016	50	23	85%
2017	65.4	15.4	31%
2018	96	30.6	47%
2019	125.5	29.5	31%
2020	287.8	162.3	129%
2021	446.6	158.8	55%
2022	658	211.4	47%

Utility-scale solar generation in Iowa (GWh)
Year	Total	Jan	Feb	Mar	Apr	May	Jun	Jul	Aug	Sep	Oct	Nov	Dec	Percent of total annual electricity generation
2017	3	0	0	0	0	0	1	1	0	1	0	0	0	
2018	11	1	1	1	1	1	1	2	1	1	1	0	0	
2019	16	1	0	1	1	2	2	2	2	2	1	1	1	
2020	23	1	2	2	2	2	3	3	3	2	1	1	1	
2021	214	9	14	20	22	23	28	27	24	13	12	12	10	
2022	387	11	16	26	24	31	41	51	58	46	43	24	16	0.5%
2023	521	17	32	39	52	67	63	67	62	47	34	27	14	0.7%
2024	665	18	38	48	61	76	77	75	74	66	61	38	33	0.9%
2025	1298	62	85	123	119	146	150	155	153	115	84	60	46	1.7%
2026	712 (through Jun)	63	89	111	122	166	161							1.9% (through Jun)

== Solar farms ==
As of year 2020, Iowa hosts six grid-connected facilities with generating capacity larger than 1.5 MW. The largest is the 3.8 MW_{AC} West Dubuque Solar Garden, commissioned for Alliant Energy in September 2017.

== See also ==
- Agrivoltaics
- Bifacial solar cells
- Horizontal axis solar trackers
- Wind power in Iowa
- Solar power in the United States
- Renewable energy in the United States
