= Bridge No. 5388 =

Historic bridge in Mower County, Minnesota

- U.S. National Register of Historic Places
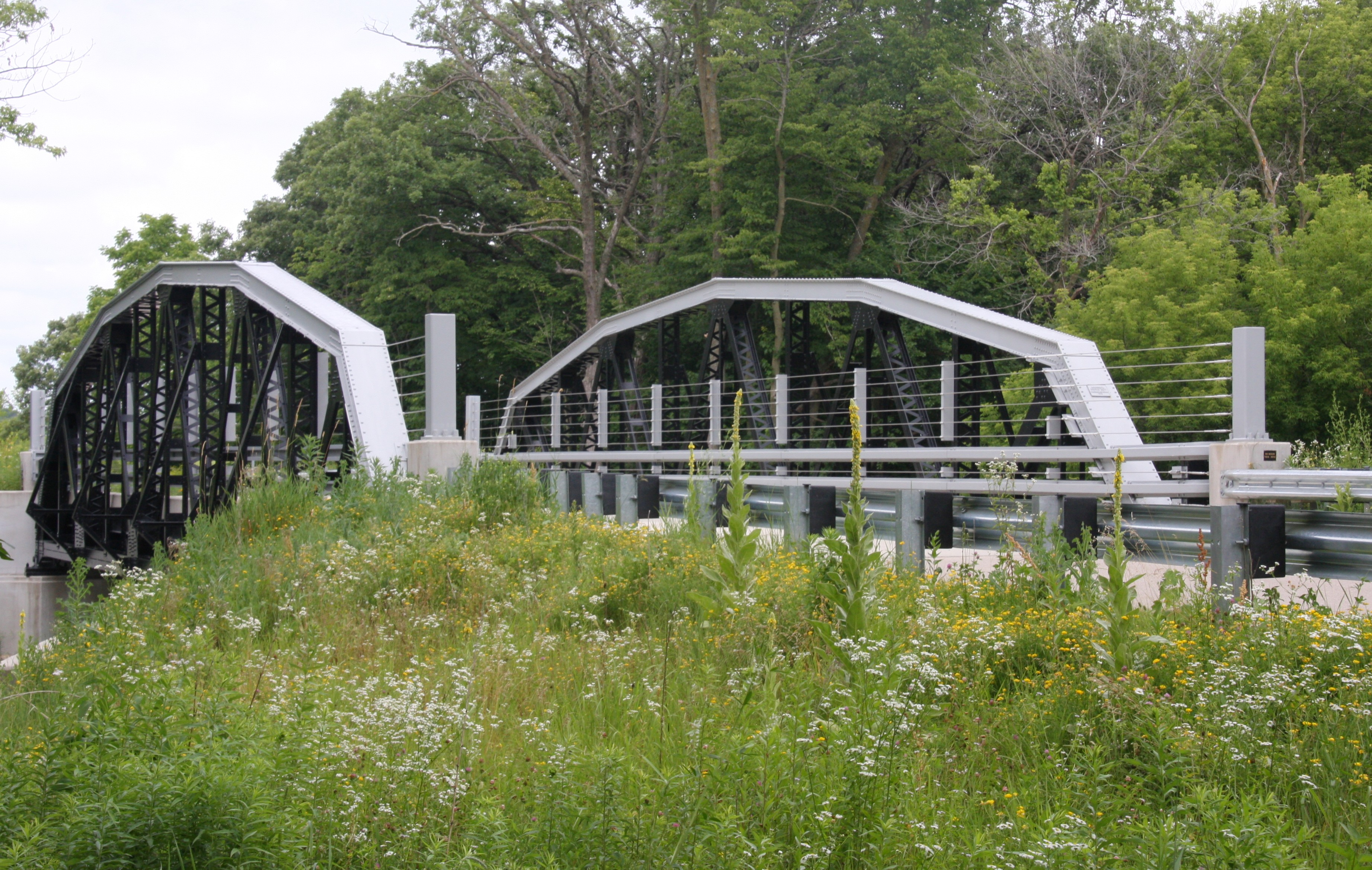

- Location within Minnesota
- Nearest city: Kingston, Minnesota
- Coordinates: 43°31′56″N 92°31′7″W
- Area: less than one acre
- Built: 1935
- Built by: Teberg and Berg
- Architect: Minnesota Highway Department
- Architectural style: Warren polygonal pony truss
- MPS: Iron and Steel Bridges in Minnesota MPS
- NRHP reference No.: 98000718
- Added to NRHP: June 26, 1998

Bridge No. 5388 is a pony truss bridge that formerly carried Minnesota State Highway 24 over the North Fork of the Crow River in Meeker County, Minnesota at 45°12′13″N 94°23′17″W. The bridge was removed from its location on Trunk Highway 24 in 2008. In 2011 it was moved to Le Roy Township, Mower County, Minnesota and now carries 130th Street over the Little Ohio River within Lake Louise State Park. It was a fracture critical bridge and was no longer suitable for Minnesota's state highway system.

The bridge is 100 feet (30 m) long and 26 feet (7.9 m) wide. It was built at a cost of $22,240 by the firm of Teberg and Berg of St. Paul. At the time it was built, it was Minnesota's longest Warren pony truss span ever built by the Minnesota Highway Department. The bridge's cost was reduced by using a polygonal top chord instead of a horizontal chord, which reduced the amount of steel required to build the web. The Minnesota Highway Department was starting to consider that Warren pony trusses were obsolete, and no longer recommended them in standard plans published in the mid-1940s.

In its new location in Lake Louise State Park, the bridge will be used by the public for horseback riding, bicycling, and walking, while the Minnesota Department of Natural Resources may use it for light vehicle traffic.
