= Harvey B. Sathre =

American politician

Harvey B. Sathre (February 23, 1920 – November 19, 2013) was an American farmer and politician.

Born in Austin, Minnesota, he was the oldest of seven children to John Burdette and Bertha Emelia Sathre, he served in the United States Army during World War II. Sathre was a dairy farmer. From 1963 to 1973, Sathre served in the Minnesota House of Representatives. In 1980, Sathre served as Mayor of Adams, Minnesota. He died at his home in Adams, Minnesota.
