= Michael Kramer (Minnesota politician) =

American politician (1886–1955)

Michael Kramer (February 21, 1886 – September 29, 1955) was an American farmer. railway employee, and politician.

Kramer was born on a farm in Adams, Mower County, Minnesota and went to the Mower County public schools. He lived in Belview, Redwood County, Minnesota with his wife and family and was a farmer and a railway mail clerk. Krmaer served in the Minnesota House of Representatives from 1923 to 1932. He died in Redwood County, Minnesota.
