= Energy in Iowa =

Sources of Iowa utility-scale electricity generation:
full-year 2022
1. Wind (62.4%)
2. Coal (25.4%)
3. Natural Gas (9.20%)
4. Hydroelectric (1.60%)
5. Solar (1.00%)
6. Biomass (0.30%)
7. Petroleum (0.20%)

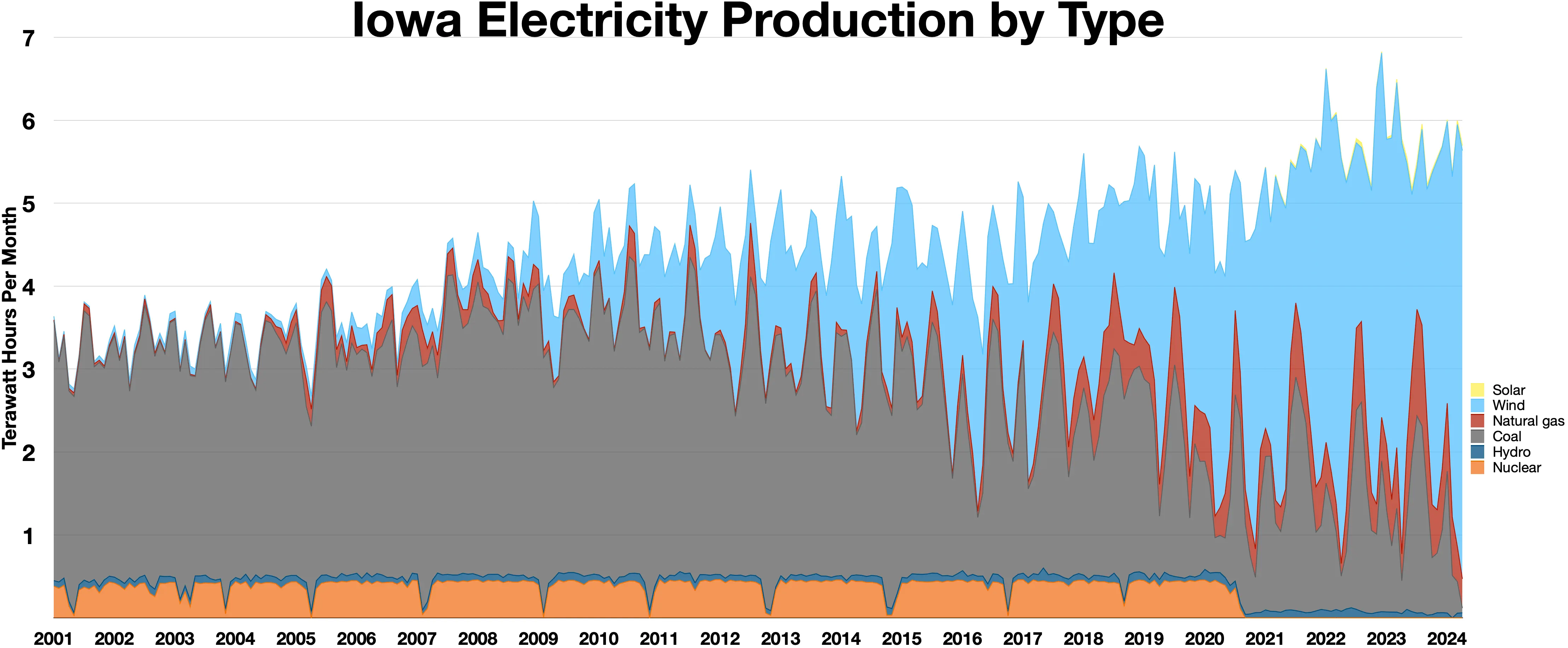
Iowa electricity production by type

Iowa is one of the largest states by electric production and the largest one that does not produce petroleum. In 2021, Iowa had a total summer capacity of 21,771 MW through all of its power plants, and in 2022 Iowa had a net generation of 71,316 gigawatt-hours. The corresponding electrical energy generation mix was 62.4% wind, 25.4% coal, 9.2% natural gas, 1.6% hydroelectric, 1% solar, 0.2% petroleum and 0.3% biomass. Small-scale solar, which includes customer-owned photovoltaic panels, delivered 308 GWh to the state's electrical grid.

Iowa has been among the top-five energy-consuming states, due in large part to its productive agriculture industry. State regulators implemented the nation's first renewable portfolio standard (RPS) applied to investor-owned utilities in 1983. The goal of 105 megawatts was soon met, and was exceeded nearly 100 times over by the end of 2019. All electrical utility customers have had the option to support further expansion of renewable generation since 2004, and regulators have also taken steps to encourage greater efficiency of energy use. Iowa has produced more electricity than it has consumed since 2008.

== Ethanol ==
In 2022, Iowa was estimated to produce 4,500,000,000 U.S. gallons (1.7×10^{10} L) of ethanol per year, a quarter of the national capacity. As such, Iowa is the largest state by ethanol production capacity. However, the state's production is nearing capacity for its 42 plants.

== Hydroelectric ==
According to National Hydropower Association, Iowa produces 980,000 MWh through conventional hydropower. On the Mississippi River, Iowa has four hydroelectric plants. The largest is found in Keokuk.

Hydroelectric dams were originally used for grinding grain in the 1830s. However, they are being dismantled for environmental purposes.

== Nuclear ==
Duane Arnold Energy Center is Iowa's only nuclear power plant. The facility was to be decommissioned in October, 2020. However, storm damage caused the facility to permanently shut down in August 2020. The facility's owner, NextEra Energy, and Google announced a major agreement in late 2025 to restart the facility to help power AI data center projects in Iowa. The plant is targeting a return to commercial operation by early 2029.

== Solar power ==
Iowa produced 349 megawatts of solar power installed as of March 2022. Rooftop solar panels alone can produce 20% of Iowa's energy.

== Wind power ==
Wind power makes up 62% of Iowa's electric production.

== See also ==
- List of power stations in Iowa
