= Adams Township, Mower County, Minnesota =

Adams Township, Minnesota
- Township
- Location within the state of Minnesota Adams Township, Minnesota (the United States)
- Coordinates: 43°32′51″N 92°45′27″W
- Country: United States
- State: Minnesota
- County: Mower

Area
  - Total: 34.9 sq mi (90.5 km^{2})
  - Land: 34.9 sq mi (90.5 km^{2})
  - Water: 0 sq mi (0.0 km^{2})
- Elevation: 1,250 ft (381 m)

Population (2000)
  - Total: 475
  - Density: 13/sq mi (5.2/km^{2})
- Time zone: UTC-6 (Central (CST))
  - Summer (DST): UTC-5 (CDT)
- ZIP code: 55909
- Area code: 507
- FIPS code: 27-00208
- GNIS feature ID: 0663380
- Website: https://www.adamsmn.com/

Adams Township is a township in Mower County, Minnesota, United States. The population was 475 at the 2000 census. The largest town in the township is Adams with a population of 800 people.

== Geography ==
According to the United States Census Bureau, the township has a total area of 34.9 square miles (90 km^{2}), all land.

== History ==
Adams Township was organized in 1858. By one account, Adams Township was named by an early settler, William Madden, for a friend of his in New York State. By another account, it was named for President John Adams and/or his son, President John Quincy Adams. The first settler, Thomas Knudtson, came in 1855 and built a log house on his claim in Section 2. The first town meeting was held in 1858. The first town meeting was held on the open prairie in section 16, which is approximately one mile south and two miles west of the city of Adams. At this meeting the people of the township elected a township board, a treasurer, a clerk, two justices of the peace and two constables.

== Demographics ==
As of the census of 2000, there were 475 people, 151 households, and 130 families residing in the township. The population density was 13.6 people per square mile (5.2/km^{2}). There were 155 housing units at an average density of 4.4/sq mi (1.7/km^{2}). The racial makeup of the township was 99.79% White and 0.21% from two or more races.

There were 151 households, out of which 45.0% had children under the age of 18 living with them, 80.1% were married couples living together, 4.6% had a female householder with no husband present, and 13.9% were non-families. 12.6% of all households were made up of individuals, and 2.6% had someone living alone who was 65 years of age or older. The average household size was 3.15 and the average family size was 3.44.

In the township the population was spread out, with 36.0% under the age of 18, 4.2% from 18 to 24, 25.5% from 25 to 44, 25.3% from 45 to 64, and 9.1% who were 65 years of age or older. The median age was 34 years. For every 100 females, there were 112.1 males. For every 100 females age 18 and over, there were 111.1 males.

The median income for a household in the township was $50,500, and the median income for a family was $54,167. Males had a median income of $30,000 versus $25,625 for females. The per capita income for the township was $16,218. About 6.2% of families and 7.1% of the population were below the poverty line, including 9.6% of those under age 18 and 13.9% of those age 65 or over.

== Johnsburg ==
Johnsburg is a small unincorporated area near the southern border with Iowa. It is located along Mower County Highway 7.

== Cemetery ==
- St. John's Lutheran Cemetery is located in the southeast quadrant of section 32 of the township. Its oldest known burial dates to the early 1870s.
