= Pioneer Prairie Wind Farm =

Wind farm in Iowa, United States

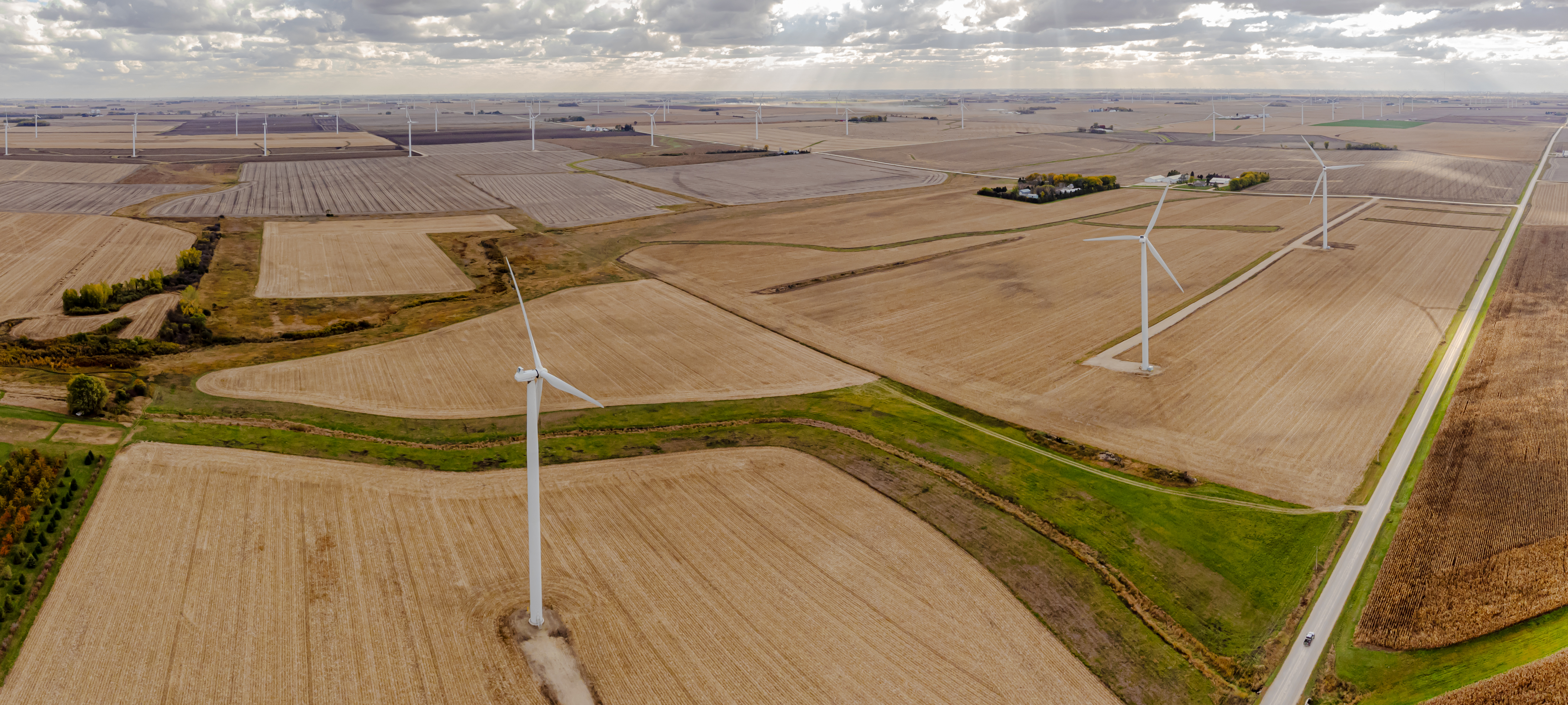
- Right on the Iowa / Minnesota border close to Le Roy, Minnesota (Click for video)
- Country: United States
- Location: Howard and Mitchell counties, Iowa
- Coordinates: 43°28′35″N 92°35′8″W
- Status: Operational

Wind farm
- Type: Onshore

Power generation
- Nameplate capacity: 300 MW

The Pioneer Prairie Wind Farm, which is located in Iowa along the Minnesota state line in Howard and Mitchell counties, has an installed capacity of 300 MW. Energy from wind farm is delivered to homes and businesses in Tennessee Valley Authority's service area in parts of seven southeastern states.

== See also ==
- List of onshore wind farms
- List of wind farms in the United States
- Wind power in Iowa
