= Rolling Hills Wind Farm =

Wind farms in the United States

The Rolling Hills Wind Farm may be one of two wind farms, one in Wyoming, the other in Iowa.

The Wyoming Rolling Hills Wind farm is located near Glenrock in Converse county and has 66 turbines with a total nameplate capacity of 99 megawatts. It is built on a former coal strip mine, and is owned by PacifiCorp, a subsidiary of MidAmerican Energy Holdings.

The Iowa wind farm is near Massena, Iowa (41°13′03″N 94°45′14″W). It has a nameplate capacity of 443.9 megawatts of power and was completed in December 2011. The project was built for MidAmerican Energy Company, a Des Moines, Iowa-based company and subsidiary of MidAmerican Energy Holdings. With 193 Siemens 2.3 MW wind turbines, it was the largest wind farm in Iowa when built.

== See also ==
- Wind power in Iowa
- Wind power in Wyoming
- Wind power in the United States
