= Lake Louise State Park =

Lake Louise
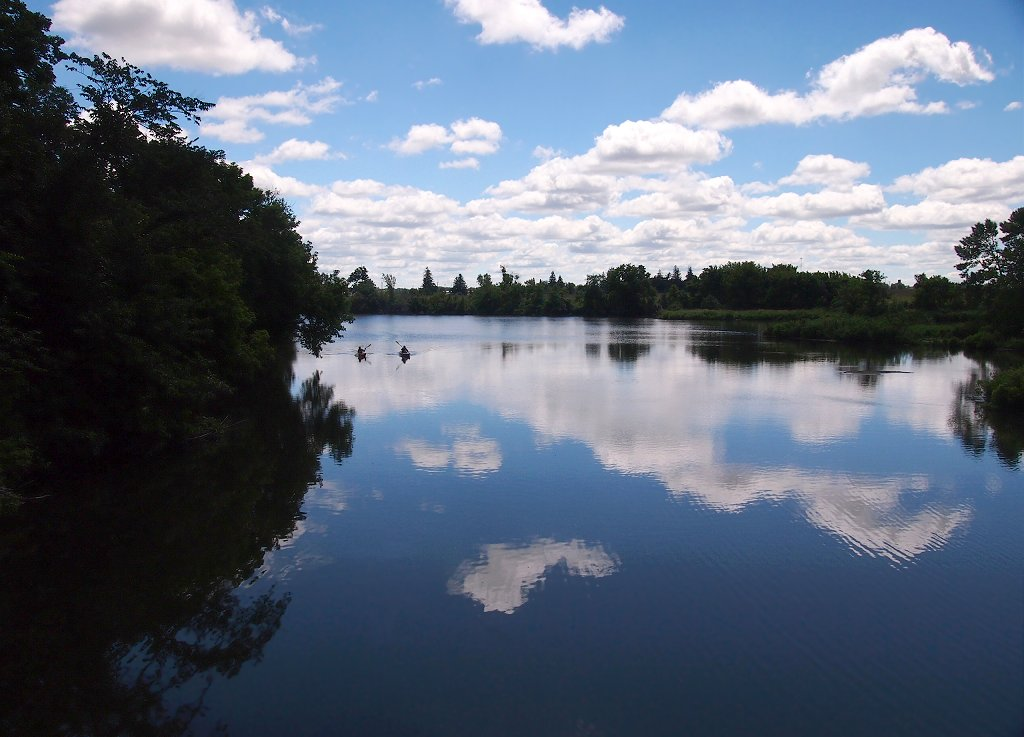

- Location within Minnesota Location within the United States
- Location: Mower County, Minnesota
- Coordinates: 43°31′24″N 092°30′55″W
- Type: reservoir
- Primary inflows: Little Iowa River
- Primary outflows: Little Iowa River
- Basin countries: United States
- Surface area: 25 acres (10 ha)

Lake Louise State Park is a Minnesota state park just north of the Iowa border near the small town of Le Roy in Mower County, Minnesota, directly south of Rochester. It has a 25 acre man-made lake and 1,168 acres (5 km^{2}) of mixed prairie and deciduous forest. It is used for picnics, swimming, camping, hiking, horseback riding, and other outdoor recreation. It is noted for butterfly watching, as some rare species have been seen. It features a picnic shelter which dates to the Public Works Administration era.

== History ==
Sometime in the late 1850s or early 1860s, Conrad Hambrecht settled in section 21 of Le Roy Township on the Upper Iowa River near the Old Village of Leroy. An earthen dam was later built on the river and Hambrecht's land sat along the small lake that was created. Hambrecht set aside this part of land for recreation and he later donated the land, then called Wildwood Park, to the city of Le Roy with the stipulation that it be used as a park. The original dam was washed away and the citizens of Le Roy rebuilt it and named the body of water "Lake Louise" for Hambrecht's sister. In 1961 local advocates arranged a visit by state park officials, who agreed that Wildwood Park could be expanded into a state park. The land was transferred to the state of Minnesota and in 1963 Lake Louise State Park was created by an act of the Minnesota Legislature. At that time it contained only the lake and 636 acres (2.6 km^{2}). The boundaries have been expanded since, but usage remains primarily local. A 1971 internal study recommended that the park be remanded to the county as a regional recreation area, but no such action was ever taken.

In 2011, Bridge No. 5388 was relocated into the park to serve as a pedestrian and equestrian bridge.
