= Walnut Wind Farm =

Wind farm in Iowa, United States

Coordinates: 41.49°N 95.25°W

The 153 megawatt (MW) capacity Walnut Wind Farm is located in Pottawattamie County, Iowa. The project, owned by MidAmerican, represents the fifth wind farm built for the group for a total of 595 MW and began operations on February 19, 2009.

== See also ==
- Wind power in the United States
- List of onshore wind farms
