= Adams, Minnesota =

City in Minnesota, United States

- City
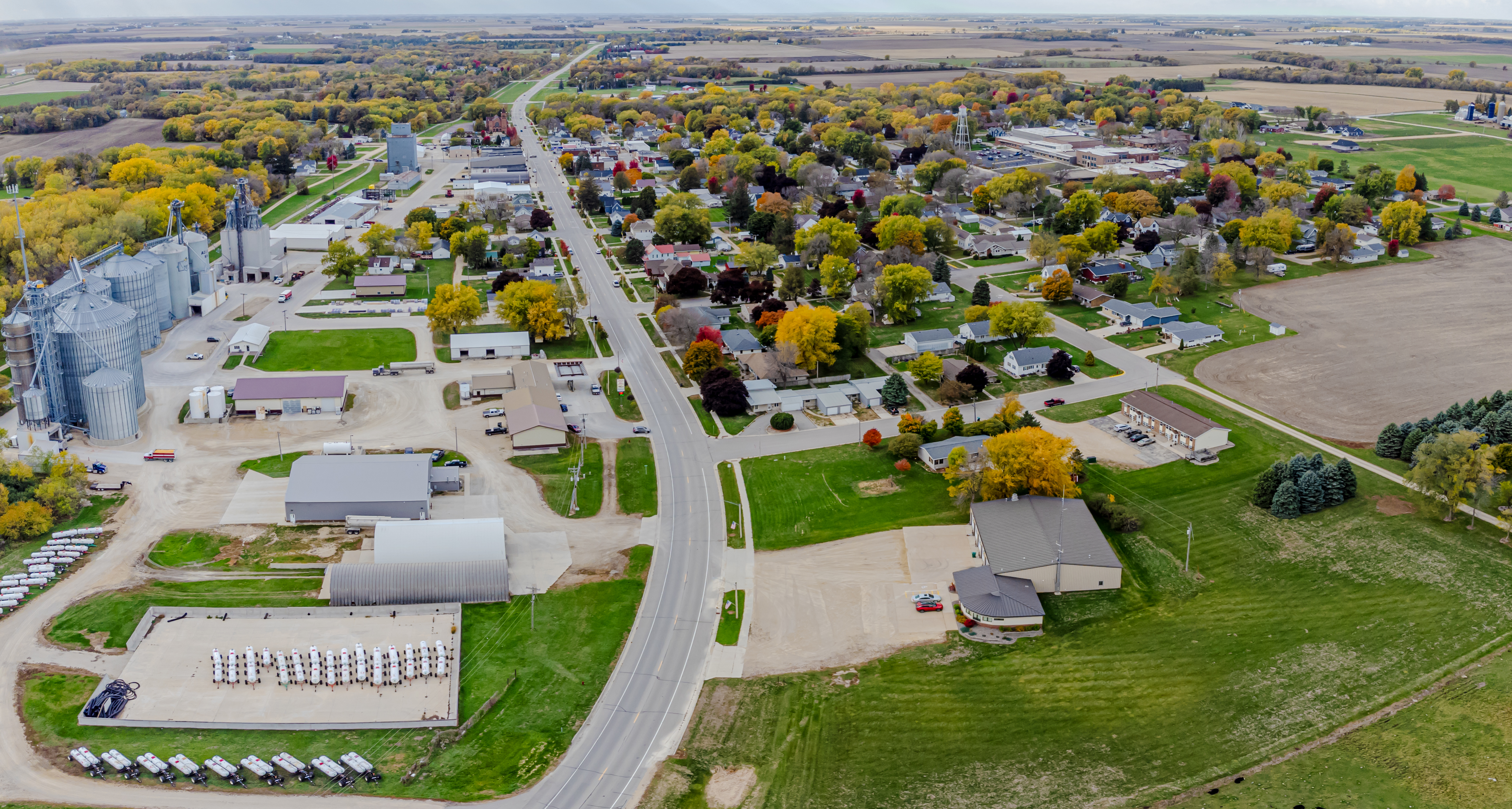
- MN-56 runs through the city.

- Location in Mower County and the state of Minnesota
- Coordinates: 43°33′55″N 92°43′09″W
- Country: United States
- State: Minnesota
- County: Mower

Area
  - Total: 1.00 sq mi (2.60 km^{2})
  - Land: 1.00 sq mi (2.60 km^{2})
  - Water: 0 sq mi (0.00 km^{2})
- Elevation: 1,283 ft (391 m)

Population (2020)
  - Total: 683
  - Density: 680.9/sq mi (262.89/km^{2})
- Time zone: UTC-6 (Central (CST))
  - Summer (DST): UTC-5 (CDT)
- ZIP code: 55909
- Area code: 507
- FIPS code: 27-00190
- GNIS feature ID: 2393881
- Website: www.adamsmn.com

Adams is a city in Adams Township, Mower County, Minnesota, United States. The population was 683 at the 2020 census, down from 787 in 2010.

== History ==
The village of Adams was platted on January 30, 1868, by Selah Chamberlain. A two-room public school was built in 1869 and was later expanded to four rooms. The village was officially incorporated on March 2, 1887. A water works system was installed in the summer of 1897. A volunteer fire department was established as Adams Hose Co. No. 1 in 1898. A sewage system was installed in 1902. A Catholic school was built in 1903 and roughly half of the public school students started attending there, greatly relieving overcrowding. The sewage system was updated in 1958. The town is in the Southland school district (which includes Southland High School), and is home to the varsity fields for the teams.

== Geography ==
Adams is in southern Mower County, surrounded by the northeast part of Adams Township. State Highway 56 passes through the center of town as Main Street, leading northwest 17 miles (27 km) to Austin, the county seat, and east-southeast 12 miles (19 km) to Le Roy. The Iowa state line is 5 miles (8 km) south of Adams via local roads.

According to the U.S. Census Bureau, the city of Adams has a total area of 1.00 square mile (2.59 km^{2}), all land. Unnamed streams pass through the southern and western part of the city, leading west to the Little Cedar River, which flows south to the Cedar River at Nashua, Iowa.

== Demographics ==
Historical population
Census	Pop.	Note	%±
1880	96		—
1890	216		125.0%
1900	573		165.3%
1910	576		0.5%
1920	609		5.7%
1930	574		−5.7%
1940	674		17.4%
1950	663		−1.6%
1960	806		21.6%
1970	771		−4.3%
1980	797		3.4%
1990	756		−5.1%
2000	800		5.8%
2010	787		−1.6%
2020	683		−13.2%
U.S. Decennial Census

=== 2010 census ===
As of the census of 2010, there were 787 people, 304 households, and 188 families living in the city. The population density was 779.2 inhabitants per square mile (300.9/km^{2}). There were 330 housing units at an average density of 326.7 per square mile (126.1/km^{2}). The racial makeup of the city was 98.3% White, 0.5% from other races, and 1.1% from two or more races. Hispanic or Latino of any race were 1.7% of the population.

There were 304 households, of which 28.3% had children under the age of 18 living with them, 50.7% were married couples living together, 7.6% had a female householder with no husband present, 3.6% had a male householder with no wife present, and 38.2% were non-families. 34.5% of all households were made up of individuals, and 20.4% had someone living alone who was 65 years of age or older. The average household size was 2.30 and the average family size was 2.95.

The median age in the city was 46.6 years. 21.3% of residents were under the age of 18; 7.3% were between the ages of 18 and 24; 19.1% were from 25 to 44; 20.8% were from 45 to 64; and 31.4% were 65 years of age or older. The gender makeup of the city was 46.4% male and 53.6% female.

=== 2000 census ===
As of the census of 2000, there were 800 people, 329 households, and 208 families living in the city. The population density was 791.6 inhabitants per square mile (305.6/km^{2}). There were 351 housing units at an average density of 347.3 per square mile (134.1/km^{2}). The racial makeup of the city was 99.25% White, 0.12% Native American, 0.38% Asian, 0.25% from other races. Hispanic or Latino of any race were 0.62% of the population.

There were 329 households, out of which 24.3% had children under the age of 18 living with them, 55.6% were married couples living together, 5.8% had a female householder with no husband present, and 36.5% were non-families. 35.0% of all households were made up of individuals, and 24.9% had someone living alone who was 65 years of age or older. The average household size was 2.21 and the average family size was 2.85.

In the city, the population was spread out, with 20.9% under the age of 18, 6.5% from 18 to 24, 19.3% from 25 to 44, 17.0% from 45 to 64, and 36.4% who were 65 years of age or older. The median age was 49 years. For every 100 females, there were 87.8 males. For every 100 females age 18 and over, there were 80.9 males.

The median income for a household in the city was $31,289, and the median income for a family was $38,125. Males had a median income of $31,083 versus $22,639 for females. The per capita income for the city was $16,550. About 4.4% of families and 6.3% of the population were below the poverty line, including 5.8% of those under age 18 and 8.2% of those age 65 or over.

== Notable people ==
- Michael Kramer, Minnesota state representative
- Hubert H. Peavey, U.S. representative from Wisconsin
- Harvey B. Sathre, Minnesota state representative
