= LeRoy Public Library =

- U.S. National Register of Historic Places
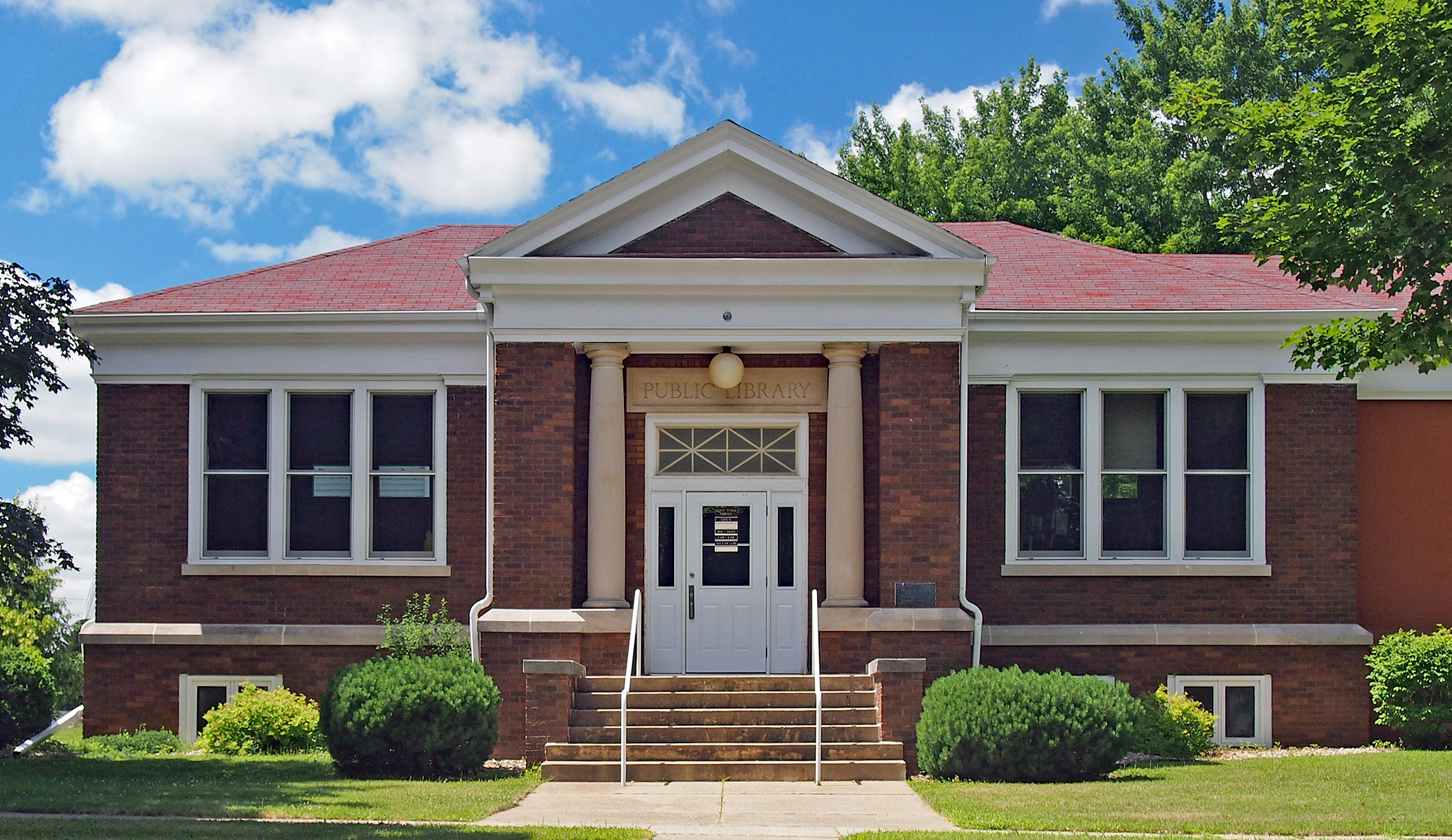
- LeRoy Public Library from the east

- Location within Minnesota Location within the United States
- Location: Luella St. and Broadway, Le Roy, Minnesota
- Coordinates: 43°30′41″N 92°30′13″W
- Built: 1915
- Architectural style: Neoclassical
- NRHP reference No.: 86000447
- Added to NRHP: March 20, 1986

LeRoy Public Library
- Location: 605 North Broadway; LeRoy, MN 55951

Other information
- Director: Brenda Kiefer

The LeRoy Public Library is public library in Le Roy, Minnesota, United States. It is a member of Southeastern Libraries Cooperating, the library region serving southeastern Minnesota.
