= Rock Island Clean Line =

Proposed transmission line in midwestern U.S.

The Rock Island Clean Line was a proposed 500-mile high voltage direct current (HVDC) transmission line. The stated purpose of the line was to transport electrical power from wind energy dense states in the Midwestern United States (Iowa, Nebraska, South Dakota and Minnesota) to the energy markets in the Chicago, Illinois, and cities further east. The planned line would run from the Sanborn, Iowa area to near Morris, Illinois. The developer, Clean Line Energy Partners, originally targeted an operational date of 2017.

The region where the line would start has large potential for wind generation, but currently already can produce all the electricity it can use or transport out of the region on existing transmission lines. The line would have the capacity to transport up to 3500 megawatts of power out of the region. An economic study for the line estimates that it could transmit the power of eight 500 MW wind farms in the Siouxland area.

The Federal Electricity Regulatory Commission approved the line in May 2012. In November 2014, the Illinois Commerce Commission approved it. As of January 2016, the Iowa Utilities Board has not yet approved it.

Opposition to the Rock Island Clean Line was organized by Block RICL, which claims that the line will carry mostly non-wind energy (i.e., coal) and will use an unreasonably large amount of land.

As of 2022, the status of the project is that it is completely dead. Clean Line withdrew its application to the Iowa Utilities Board in 2017, and Clean Line lost a decision of the Illinowas Supreme Court which held that Clean Line did not meet the ownership requirements to be a public utility in Illinois. Thus, the entire project has been killed by the two states. Clean Line is out of business and has let go all of its employees.

== See also ==
- Wind power in Illinois
- Wind power in Iowa
