= Intrepid Wind Farm =

American wind power farm

- Country: United States
- Location: Sac and Buena Vista counties, Iowa
- Coordinates: 42°33′12″N 95°19′16″W
- Status: Operational
- Owner: MidAmerican Energy Company
- Operator: MidAmerican Energy Company

Wind farm
- Type: Onshore

Power generation
- Units operational: 107
- Nameplate capacity: 160.5 MW

The Intrepid Wind Farm consists of 107 wind turbines. It became operational in 2004.

== See also ==
- Wind power in the United States
- List of large wind farms
