= Le Roy, Minnesota =

City in Minnesota, United States

- City
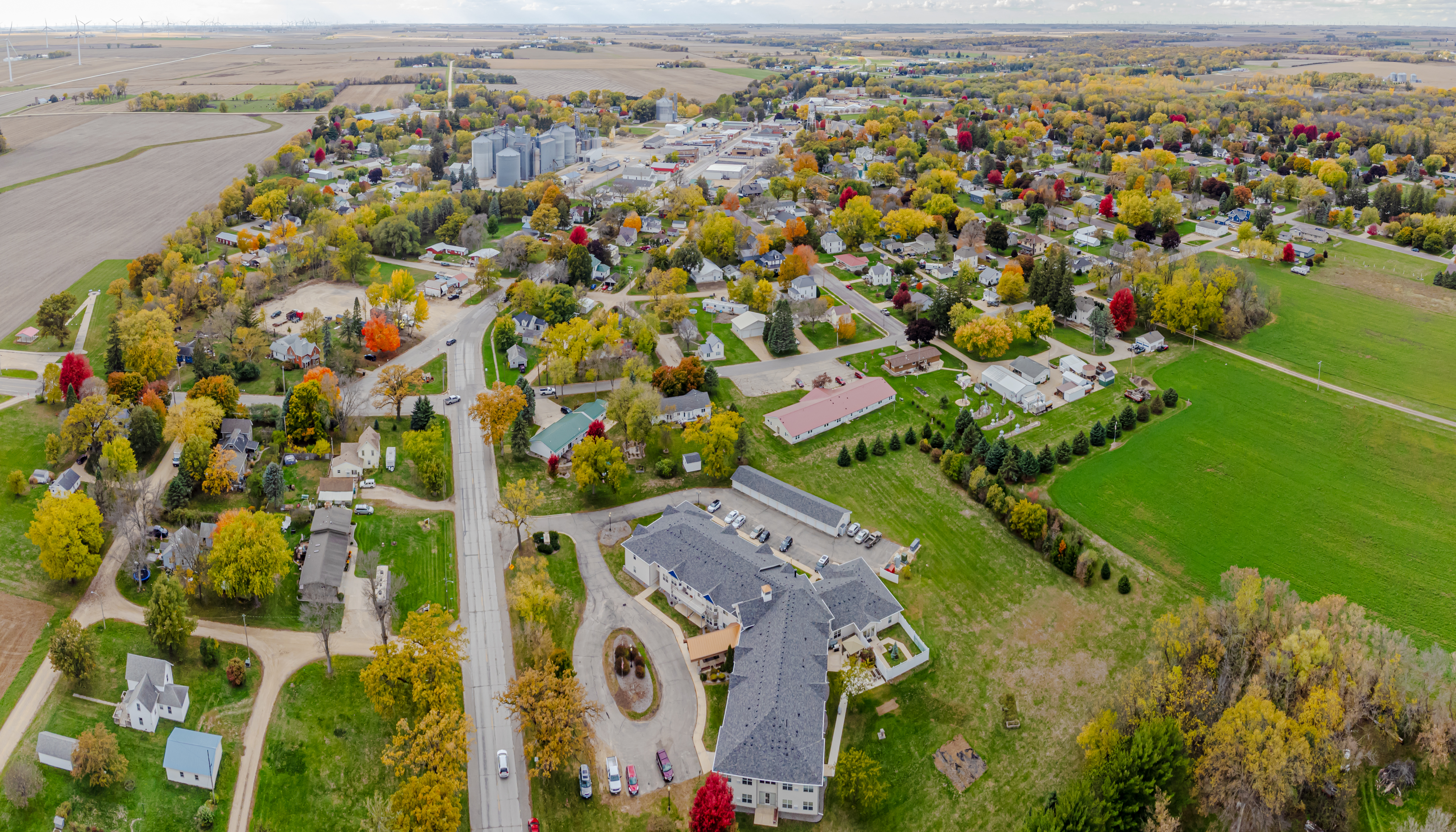

- Location in Mower County and the state of Minnesota
- Coordinates: 43°30′38″N 92°30′17″W
- Country: United States
- State: Minnesota
- County: Mower
- Platted: 1867
- Incorporated: February 26, 1876

Government
  - Mayor: Ed Koppen

Area
  - Total: 0.71 sq mi (1.83 km^{2})
  - Land: 0.71 sq mi (1.83 km^{2})
  - Water: 0 sq mi (0.00 km^{2})
- Elevation: 1,276 ft (389 m)

Population (2020)
  - Total: 957
  - Estimate (2022): 961
  - Density: 1,361.2/sq mi (525.6/km^{2})
- Time zone: UTC−6 (Central (CST))
  - Summer (DST): UTC−5 (CDT)
- ZIP code: 55951
- Area code: 507
- FIPS code: 27-36620
- GNIS feature ID: 2395657
- Sales tax: 7.375%
- Website: leroymn.com

Le Roy (/ˈliˌrɔɪ/ LEE-ROY) is a city in Mower County, Minnesota, United States, surrounded by Le Roy Township. The population was 957 at the 2020 census. Lake Louise State Park is just outside the town.

== History ==
Le Roy was platted in 1867, when the railroad was extended to that point. The city was named after Le Roy, New York, the native home of a first settler.

== Geography ==
Le Roy is in the southeast corner of Mower County, 0.5 miles (0.8 km) north of the Iowa state line. It is 29 miles (47 km) southeast of Austin, the Mower county seat. Minnesota State Highway 56 passes through the center of Le Roy, leading west-northwest 12 miles (19 km) to Adams and east 6 miles (10 km) to its terminus at U.S. Route 63, just north of Chester, Iowa.

According to the U.S. Census Bureau, the city of Le Roy has a total area of 0.71 square miles (1.84 km^{2}), all land. The city is bordered to the north by the Upper Iowa River, an east-flowing tributary of the Mississippi River. The city is bordered to the northwest by Lake Louise State Park, set on the Upper Iowa. The Shooting Star State Trail has its southeastern terminus in Le Roy.

== Demographics ==
Historical population
Census	Pop.	Note	%±
1880	432		—
1890	523		21.1%
1900	772		47.6%
1910	702		−9.1%
1920	707		0.7%
1930	661		−6.5%
1940	752		13.8%
1950	959		27.5%
1960	971		1.3%
1970	870		−10.4%
1980	930		6.9%
1990	904		−2.8%
2000	925		2.3%
2010	929		0.4%
2020	957		3.0%
2022 (est.)	961		0.4%
U.S. Decennial Census; 2020 Census

=== 2010 census ===
As of the census of 2010, there were 929 people, 428 households, and 248 families living in the city. The population density was 1,346.4 inhabitants per square mile (519.8/km^{2}). There were 488 housing units at an average density of 707.2 per square mile (273.1/km^{2}). The racial makeup of the city was 99.2% White, 0.1% Native American, 0.1% Asian, 0.2% from other races, and 0.3% from two or more races. Hispanic or Latino of any race were 0.5% of the population.

There were 428 households, of which 25.9% had children under the age of 18 living with them, 46.3% were married couples living together, 7.9% had a female householder with no husband present, 3.7% had a male householder with no wife present, and 42.1% were non-families. 37.9% of all households were made up of individuals, and 18% had someone living alone who was 65 years of age or older. The average household size was 2.17 and the average family size was 2.86.

The median age in the city was 42.1 years. 23% of residents were under the age of 18; 6.9% were between the ages of 18 and 24; 23.3% were from 25 to 44; 27.7% were from 45 to 64; and 19.3% were 65 years of age or older. The gender makeup of the city was 48.7% male and 51.3% female.

=== 2000 census ===
As of the census of 2000, there were 925 people, 411 households, and 249 families living in the city. The population density was 1,455.9 inhabitants per square mile (562.1/km^{2}). There were 433 housing units at an average density of 681.5 per square mile (263.1/km^{2}). The racial makeup of the city was 99.2% White, 0.1% African American, 0.2% Native American, 0.1% Asian, 0.1% Pacific Islander, and 0.2% from two or more races. Hispanic or Latino of any race were 1.0% of the population.

There were 411 households, out of which 24.8% had children under the age of 18 living with them, 49.6% were married couples living together, 7.1% had a female householder with no husband present, and 39.2% were non-families. 35.0% of all households were made up of individuals, and 19.7% had someone living alone who was 65 years of age or older. The average household size was 2.24 and the average family size was 2.90.

In the city, the population was spread out, with 24.4% under the age of 18, 9.3% from 18 to 24, 25.9% from 25 to 44, 18.9% from 45 to 64, and 21.4% who were 65 years of age or older. The median age was 39 years. For every 100 females, there were 98.1 males. For every 100 females age 18 and over, there were 93.6 males.

The median income for a household in the city was $34,286, and the median income for a family was $45,156. Males had a median income of $29,792 versus $18,125 for females. The per capita income for the city was $17,446. About 3.6% of families and 6.7% of the population were below the poverty line, including 7.1% of those under age 18 and 6.7% of those age 65 or over.

== Library ==
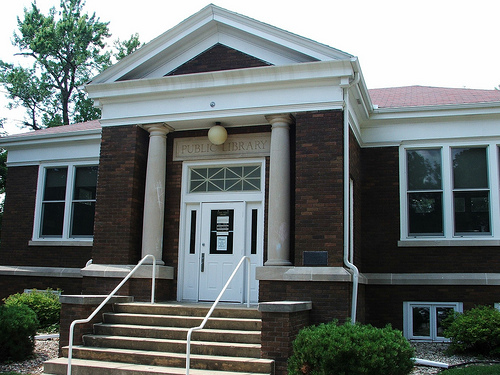
LeRoy Public Library

The LeRoy Public Library is the public library in Le Roy. It is a member of Southeastern Libraries Cooperating, the library region serving southeastern Minnesota.

== Notable people ==
- Bob Mahoney, professional baseball player
- Harlan G. Palmer, newspaper publisher
- George Sitts, serial killer, only person to be executed by electric chair in South Dakota

== See also ==
- Pioneer Prairie Wind Farm
- Taopi, Minnesota
