= Crystal Lake Wind Farm =

Wind Farm in Iowa, U.S.

- Country: United States
- Location: Crystal Lake, Iowa
- Coordinates: 43°13′45″N 93°50′28″W
- Status: Operational
- Commission date: October 2008
- Owner: NextEra Energy Resources

Wind farm
- Type: Onshore
- Hub height: 80 meters
- Rotor diameter: 82.5-116 meters

Power generation
- Nameplate capacity: 416 MW

Crystal Lake Wind Farm is an electricity generating wind farm facility in Winnebago and Hancock County, Iowa, United States. It is owned by a subsidiary of Florida-based NextEra Energy and began operations in 2008. The development and operations are managed by NextEra Energy Resources. With the completion of phase 3 of the project, it has a generating capacity of 416 megawatts. It is located roughly five miles north of Britt, Iowa, and encompasses the town of Crystal Lake, which the wind farm is named after.

== Parks ==
Crystal Lake 1 is made up of 100 General Electric 1.6 megawatt turbines. Each turbine has a 91 meter rotor diameter. These turbines can be seen surrounding the town of Crystal Lake. Crystal Lake 1 can produce a total of 160 megawatts at peak production.

Crystal Lake 2 currently contains 80 General Electric turbines. 72 turbines produce 2.5 megawatts of power, while six other turbines are rated for 2.32 megawatts of power. These turbines all feature a 116 meter rotor diameter. Crystal Lake 2 can produce 193 megawatts of power at peak generation.

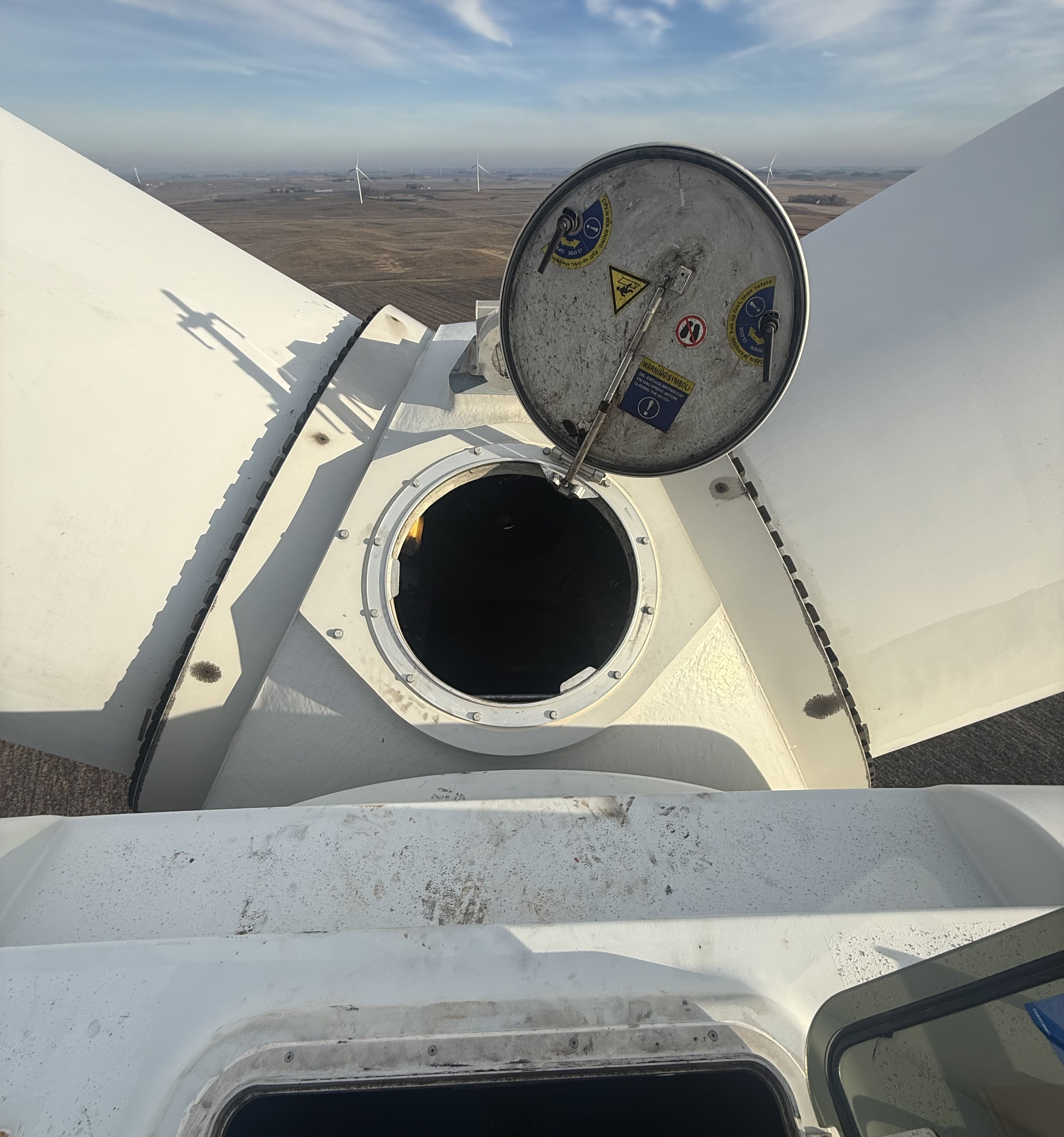
Rear Entry Hub of General Electric 2.5 megawatt turbine on Crystal Lake 2

Crystal Lake 3, which signified the latest construction of turbines in Winnebago County, consists of 43 General Electric 1.5 megawatt turbines. Each turbine has an 82.5 meter rotor diameter and a front-entry hub design. Crystal Lake 3 can produce 66 megawatts of power in total.

== Repowering Projects ==
In 2019, a large portion of the Crystal Lake Wind Farm was repowered. The primary purpose of repowering a wind turbine is to take old or outdated equipment out of service, and to install much more efficient equipment in place.

Crystal Lake 1 was repowered from 1.5 megawatt generating equipment to 1.6 megawatt generating equipment.

Crystal Lake 2 was repowered from its original configuration of 76 Model C89 Clipper Liberty wind turbines. Each Liberty turbine produced 2.64 megawatts in optimal operating conditions. During repower, the vertical tube sections of the Clipper Liberty turbines were kept in place, while new power generation equipment, a new nacelle structure, a rear-entry hub, and new blades were installed.

== Additional Operations ==
In 2022, Nextera Energy Resources entered into an agreement with Kossuth County to build and maintain 27 General Electric wind turbines southeast of Algona, Iowa. Total production capacity for this wind park is 69.6 megawatts.
