= Le Roy Township, Mower County, Minnesota =

Le Roy Township, Minnesota
- Township
- Location within the state of Minnesota Le Roy Township, Minnesota (the United States)
- Coordinates: 43°32′23″N 92°31′15″W
- Country: United States
- State: Minnesota
- County: Mower

Area
  - Total: 35.4 sq mi (91.6 km^{2})
  - Land: 35.4 sq mi (91.6 km^{2})
  - Water: 0.039 sq mi (0.1 km^{2})
- Elevation: 1,299 ft (396 m)

Population (2000)
  - Total: 396
  - Density: 11/sq mi (4.3/km^{2})
- Time zone: UTC-6 (Central (CST))
  - Summer (DST): UTC-5 (CDT)
- ZIP code: 55951
- Area code: 507
- FIPS code: 27-36638
- GNIS feature ID: 0664762

Le Roy Township is a township in Mower County, Minnesota, United States. The population was 396 at the 2000 census. The town in the township with the largest population is Le Roy with 925 people. The township is also home to Lake Louise State Park, the only Minnesota State Park in Mower County and the southernmost in the state. The Old Village of Le Roy was the first area in the township to be settled.

== History ==
Le Roy Township was organized on May 11, 1858 at a meeting held at the house of Daniel Caswell. The township was named after Caswell's native home in Le Roy, New York/

Le Roy was a small village on the banks of the Little Iowa River, one of the small streams that eventually become the Upper Iowa River. It was located in section 28 of Le Roy Township. Henry Edmonds, the first citizen of "Old Town," erected a mill on the river in 1855. The small village was platted on April 24, 1857. When the railroad was being built about one mile to the southeast in the area that is the modern-day town of Le Roy, some of the settlers starting making plans. When the first train rolled into "Le Roy Station" in August 1867, it dropped off building supplies for the new town. The new town was platted in September 1867 and some of the businesses and houses of Old Le Roy were moved intact to the new town.

== Geography ==
According to the United States Census Bureau, the township has a total area of 35.4 square miles (92 km^{2}), of which 35.4 square miles (92 km^{2}) is land and 0.04 square miles (0.10 km^{2}) (0.08%) is water. The small streams of the southeastern part of the township are tributaries of the Upper Iowa River, which eventually winds its way to the Mississippi River.

== Demographics ==
As of the census of 2000, there were 396 people, 142 households, and 111 families residing in the township. The population density was 11.2 inhabitants per square mile (4.3/km^{2}). There were 149 housing units at an average density of 4.2 per square mile (1.6/km^{2}). The racial makeup of the township was 99.49% White, and 0.51% from two or more races.

There were 142 households, out of which 39.4% had children under the age of 18 living with them, 73.9% were married couples living together, 0.7% had a female householder with no husband present, and 21.8% were non-families. 19.0% of all households were made up of individuals, and 7.0% had someone living alone who was 65 years of age or older. The average household size was 2.79 and the average family size was 3.22.

In the township the population was spread out, with 29.8% under the age of 18, 6.1% from 18 to 24, 28.3% from 25 to 44, 23.7% from 45 to 64, and 12.1% who were 65 years of age or older. The median age was 38 years. For every 100 females, there were 118.8 males. For every 100 females age 18 and over, there were 109.0 males.

The median income for a household in the township was $37,857, and the median income for a family was $42,292. Males had a median income of $29,028 versus $21,875 for females. The per capita income for the township was $24,077. About 1.9% of families and 3.2% of the population were below the poverty line, including none of those under age 18 and 11.0% of those age 65 or over.

== Cemeteries ==
- Bethany Lutheran Cemetery is located in the southeast corner of the southwest quadrant of section 11 of the township. Its oldest known burial dates to 1879.
- Le Roy Lutheran Cemetery is located in section 28 of the township.
- St. Patrick Catholic Cemetery is adjoined to Le Roy Lutheran Cemetery.
