= Johnsburg, Minnesota =

- Unincorporated community
- Location within Minnesota Location within the United States
- Coordinates: 43°30′20″N 92°46′09″W
- Country: United States
- State: Minnesota
- County: Mower
- Township: Adams
- Elevation: 1,257 ft (383 m)
- Time zone: UTC-6 (Central (CST))
  - Summer (DST): UTC-5 (CDT)
- Area code: 507
- GNIS feature ID: 645673

Johnsburg is an unincorporated community in Adams Township, Mower County, Minnesota, United States.
