= Story County Wind Farm =

Wind farm in Iowa, United States

- Country: United States
- Location: North of Colo, Iowa
- Coordinates: 42°03′38″N 93°16′14″W
- Commission date: November 2008, December 2009

Power generation
- Nameplate capacity: 300 MW

The Story County Wind Farm is a 300 megawatt wind energy farm in Story County, Iowa, half of which went online in November 2008 and the other half went online in December 2009. It can be seen when driving toward Ames on Highway 30.

== See also ==
- List of onshore wind farms
- List of wind farms in the United States
