= Whispering Willow Wind Farm – East =

Wind farm in Iowa, U.S.

Coordinates: 42.735°N 93.338°W

The Whispering Willow Wind Farm – East in Franklin County, Iowa, USA, has a capacity of 200 megawatts (MW) and was completed in 2009. It consists of 121 wind turbines spread out over roughly 140 square kilometres (54 sq mi). Construction of the wind farm began in 2008.

== See also ==
- List of onshore wind farms
