= MidAmerican Energy Company =

American electric and gas company

- Type: Subsidiary
- Industry: Electricity; Natural gas
- Predecessor: Iowa-Illinois Gas and Electric Company; Midwest Resources Inc.; Midwest Power Systems Inc.
- Founded: July 1, 1995; 31 years ago in United States
- Headquarters: Des Moines, Iowa, United States
- Area served: Iowa; Illinois; South Dakota; Nebraska
- Key people: Kelcey Brown (President & CEO)
- Number of employees: 3,400
- Parent: Berkshire Hathaway Energy
- Website: midamericanenergy.com

MidAmerican Energy Company (MidAmerican) is an American energy company based in Des Moines, Iowa. Its service area includes almost two-thirds of Iowa, as well as portions of Illinois, South Dakota, and Nebraska. Its territory is wholly encompassed by the territory of the Midcontinent Independent System Operator. Major cities in MidAmerican's service territory are Des Moines, Sioux City, Sioux Falls, Council Bluffs, Waterloo, Iowa City, and the Quad Cities.

MidAmerican is a subsidiary of Berkshire Hathaway Energy.

== History ==
MidAmerican was formed in 1995 by the merger of the Iowa-Illinois Gas and Electric Company, the main electric and gas provider for southeastern Iowa, with Midwest Resources, the main power provider for central and western Iowa. Midwest Resources in turn, was formed in 1990 by the merger of Midwest Energy and Iowa Resources. Midwest Energy was the holding company for Iowa Public Service company (IPS), the main power provider for northwestern Iowa, while Iowa Resources was the holding company for Iowa Power and Light Company, the main power provider for central and southwestern Iowa.

By 2017, the company had 760,000 electric customers and over 740,000 natural gas customers.

== Coal Generation ==
MidAmerican owns and operates 5 coal plants in the state of Iowa, including units in Salix (near Sioux City), Ottumwa, Louisa, Council Bluffs. The Clean Up MidAm Coalition was launched in 2022 to shed light on the health and climate change impacts of these coal plants.

== Walter Scott, Jr. Energy Center ==
MidAmerican is the developer and operator of the Walter Scott, Jr. Energy Center, a four-unit coal-fired power plant based in Council Bluffs. It produces more than 1,600 megawatts of electricity.

== Renewable energy ==
In addition to traditional power plants, MidAmerican began investing in green energy generation in 2004. As of March 2014, approximately 2,285 megawatts, or nearly 30 percent, of MidAmerican’s total owned generation capacity came from energy generated by the company’s 1,267 wind turbines. In May 2013, MidAmerican announced plans to invest up to $1.9 billion to expand its wind generation fleet and add up to 1,050 megawatts of wind generation in Iowa by year-end 2015. Siemens Wind Power, the manufacturer of the turbines, states that at the time (December 2013) this was the largest single order of onshore wind power turbines that any company had ever received. Components for the turbines are manufactured at two different sites in Iowa and Kansas, and all turbines are to be sited in Iowa. Once the expansion is complete, approximately 3,335 megawatts, or approximately 39 percent, of MidAmerican’s total owned generation capacity will come from wind-powered generation from 1,715 wind turbines. MidAmerican projects that wind power will supply one third of its energy generation by 2020. As of 2016, MAE operates 2 GW of SWP turbines and 1 GW GE Wind. In June 2016 MAE signed up for 2 GW in Iowa (Wind XI) supplied by Vestas in Colorado, estimated at $2.2 billion. On July 26, 2016, MAE agreed to supply power to Facebook, Microsoft and Google datacenters in Iowa from Wind XI.

In May 2018, MidAmerican announced a new large-scale wind energy project called “Wind XII.” The project consists of 591 megawatts worth of energy created by wind in Iowa. Wind XII will make MidAmerican the first investor-owned electric utility in the United States to generate renewable energy equal to 100% of its customers usage each year.

== Hiring of veterans ==
MidAmerican won the "Military Friendly Employer Award" in 2017 for its efforts to hire veterans. On its website, the company provides an "Opportunities for Veterans" section that pinpoints which civilian positions open at the company translate well from a military career. Examples of jobs include engineering, outage project managers, and plant operators.

== See also ==
- Intrepid Wind Farm
- Rolling Hills Wind Farm
