= Pet cemetery =

Place of burial for domestic animals

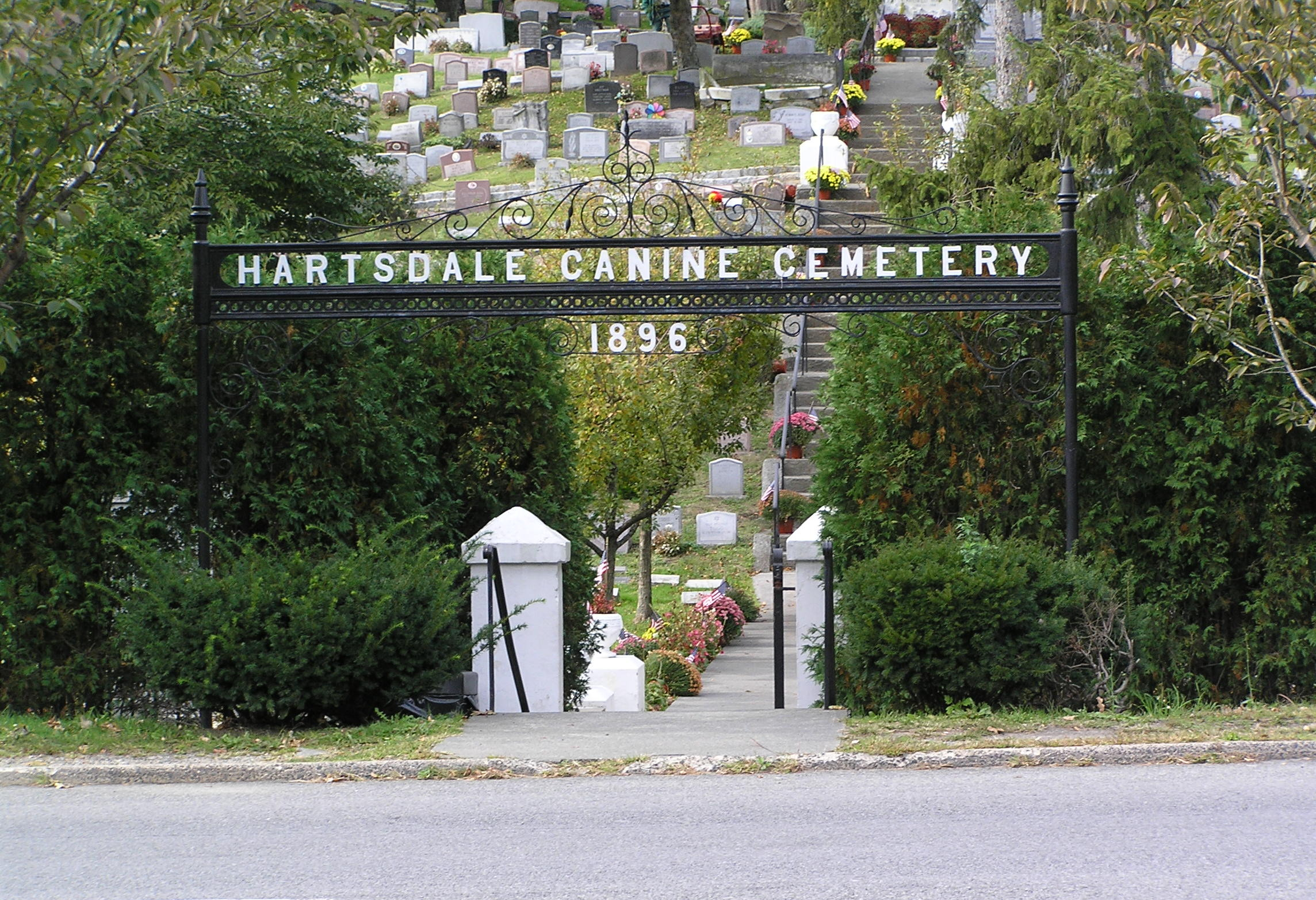
Entrance to Hartsdale Pet Cemetery in Hartsdale, New York

A pet cemetery is a cemetery for pets. Although the veneration and burial of beloved pets has been practiced since ancient times, burial grounds reserved specifically for animals were not common until the late 19th century.

== History ==
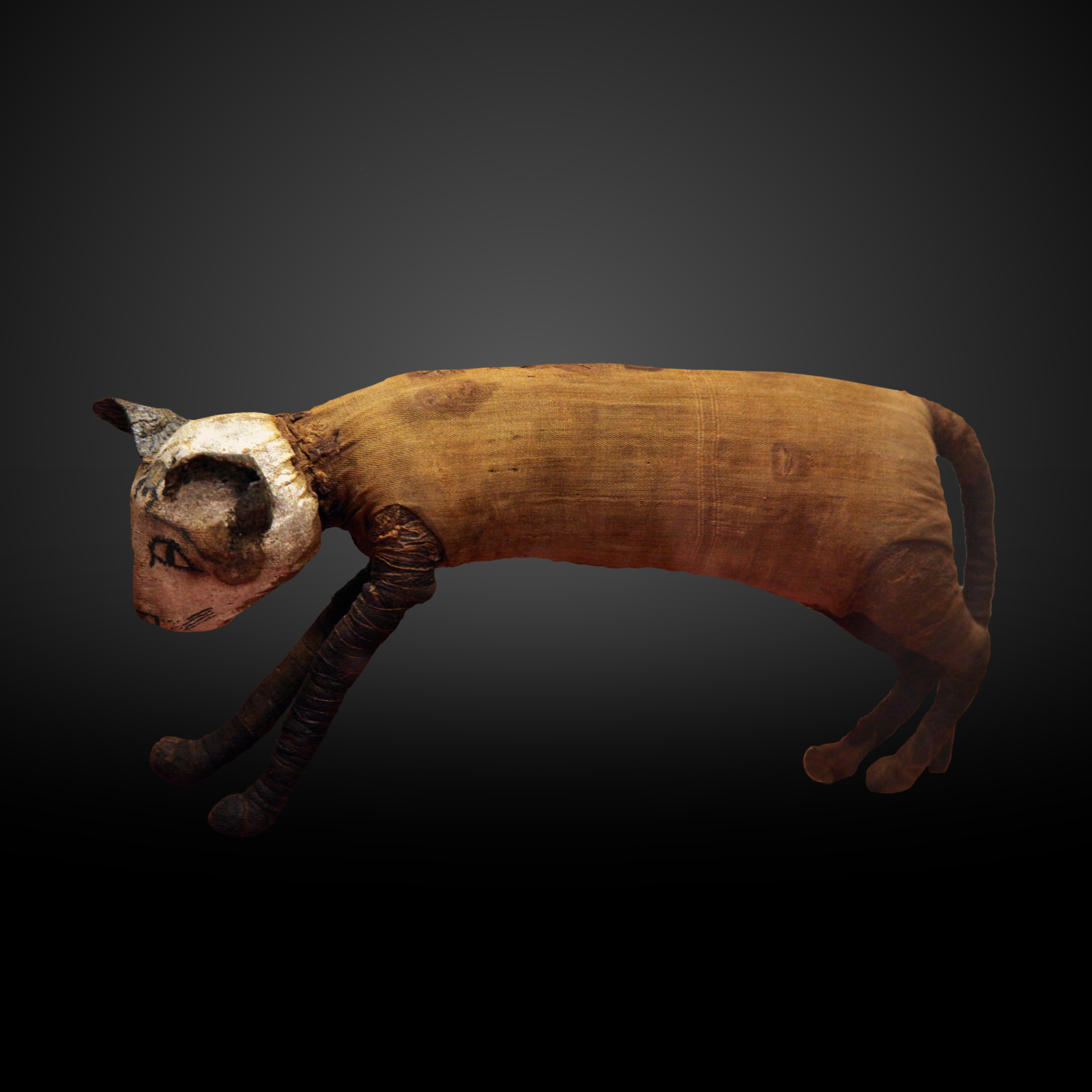
Mummified cat at the Louvre

Many human cultures buried animal remains. For example, the Ancient Egyptians mummified and buried cats, which they considered deities; one of the oldest known pet cemeteries, the Berenice pet cemetery, mainly used for cat burials, was found during the excavation of the Berenice Troglodytica seaport in 2011 and was used between the 1st and 2nd century CE. Archaeologists have found that dogs were buried alongside humans in Siberia as many as 8,000 years ago. The Ashkelon dog cemetery, the largest known dog cemetery in the ancient world, was discovered at the Ashkelon National Park in Ashkelon, Israel.

The Hiran Minar near Lahore, Pakistan is a minaret that was built in approximately 1606 CE by the Mughal Emperor Jahangir in honor of his beloved pet antelope Mansraj.

London's Hyde Park was the site of an informal pet cemetery between 1881 and 1903, in the gatekeeper's garden. From the first burial of "Cherry" until its official closure in 1903, it received 300 burials with miniature headstones, with a final special burial of the Royal Marines mascot dog "Prince" in 1967.

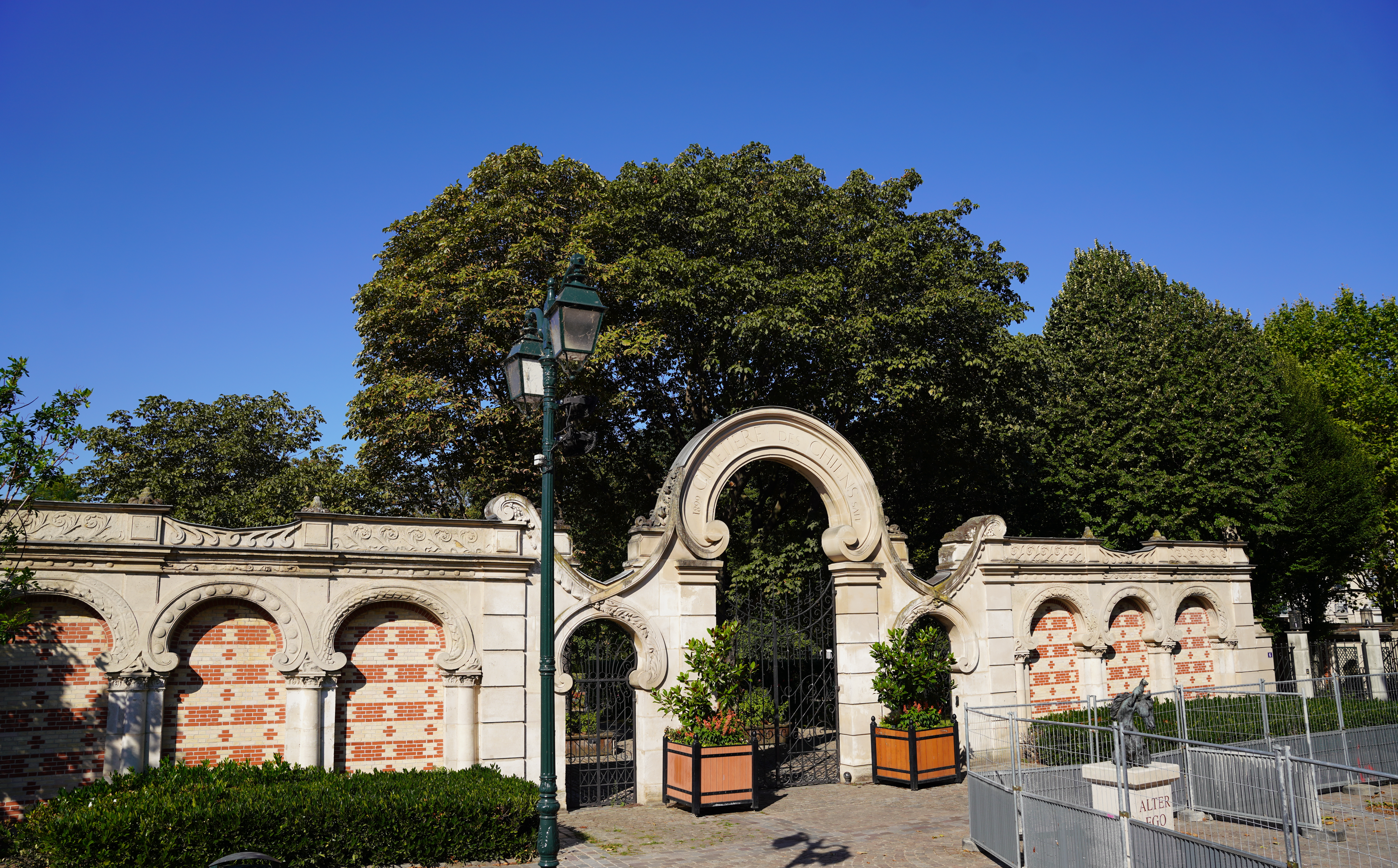
Cimetière des Chiens

Cimetière des Chiens in Asnières-sur-Seine in Paris, dating from 1899, is an elaborate, sculpted pet cemetery believed to be one of the first public zoological necropolis in the world.

Finland's first pet cemetery was established in 1927 in Ruskeasuo, Helsinki, from where it moved to its current location in the Helsinki Central Park in 1947. The cemetery is maintained by the Helsinki Animal Welfare Association (HESY).

America's largest and oldest pet cemetery is the Hartsdale Pet Cemetery in Hartsdale, New York. It dates from 1896, when a veterinarian working out of Manhattan offered to let a grieving pet owner bury her dog at his hillside apple orchard. Today, it is the final resting place to around 80,000 animals including famous ones such as Mariah Carey's cat Clarence and Ming the tiger. The site was listed on the National Register of Historic Places in 2012. Some other famous American pet cemeteries include Aspin Hill Memorial Park in Silver Spring, Maryland, believed to be the second-oldest in America, as well as the Pet Memorial Cemetery in Calabasas, California, where Hopalong Cassidy's horse, Topper, Steven Spielberg's Jack Russell Terrier, and Rudolph Valentino's dog, Kabar, are buried.

== Burial with humans ==
At some cemeteries, such as Woodside Pet Cemetery in Navarre, Ohio and Aspin Hill Memorial Park, human and animal remains may be interred alongside each other. In January 2010, West Lindsey District Council gave permission for a site in the village of Stainton by Langworth to inter animal remains alongside human remains as part of a "green burial" site, making it the first place in England where pets could be buried alongside their owners. In 2011, New York State formally adopted guidelines to allow human burials in pet cemeteries as long as the cemetery doesn't advertise it or charge a burial fee.

== Gallery ==
=== Asia ===
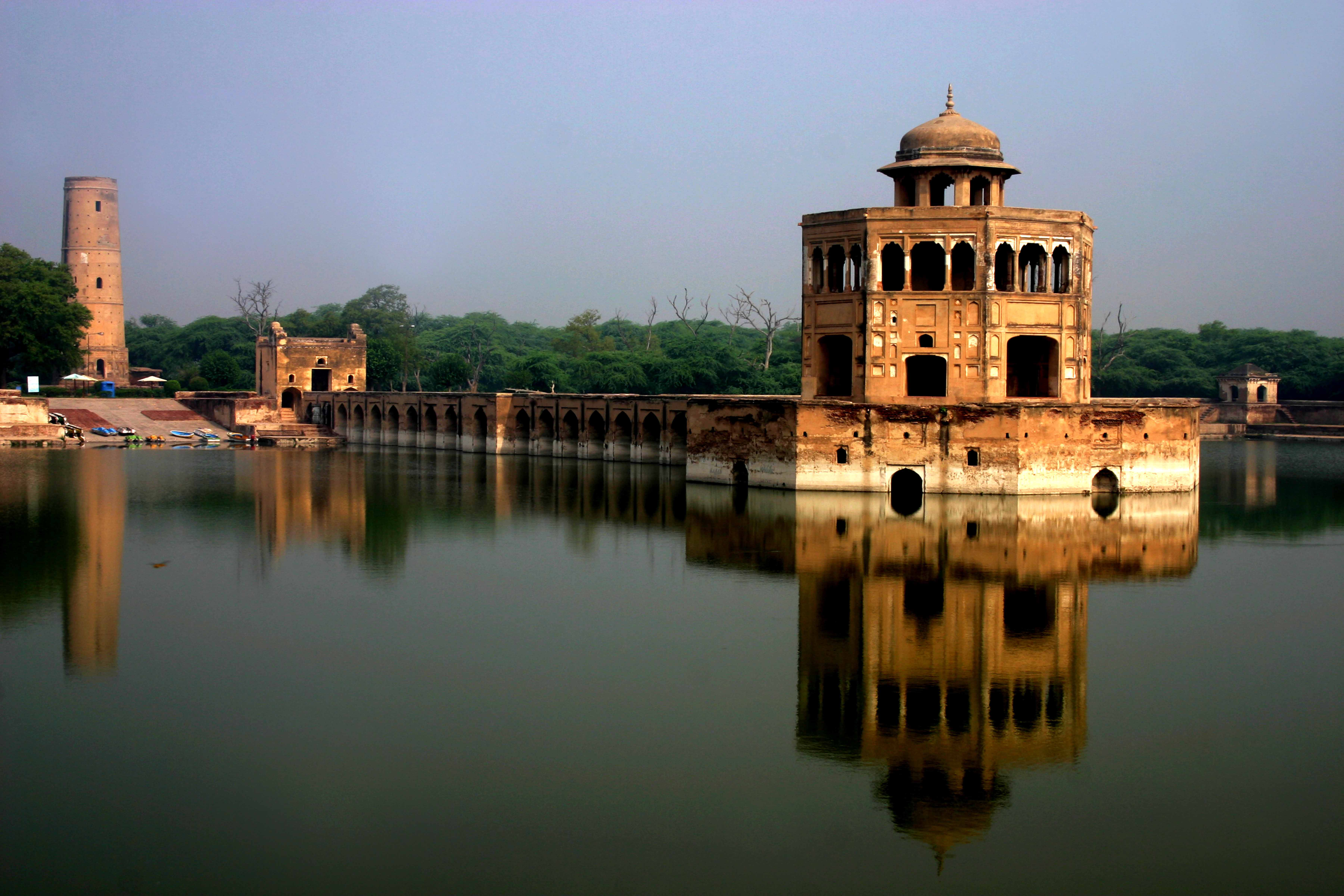
Hiran Minar near Lahore, Pakistan

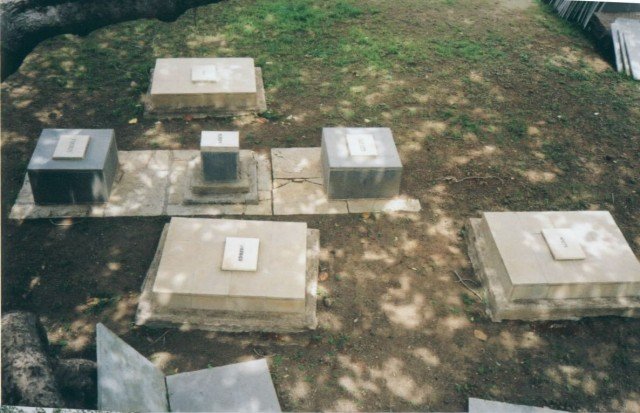
Meher Baba's animal tombs, Upper Meherabad

=== Europe ===
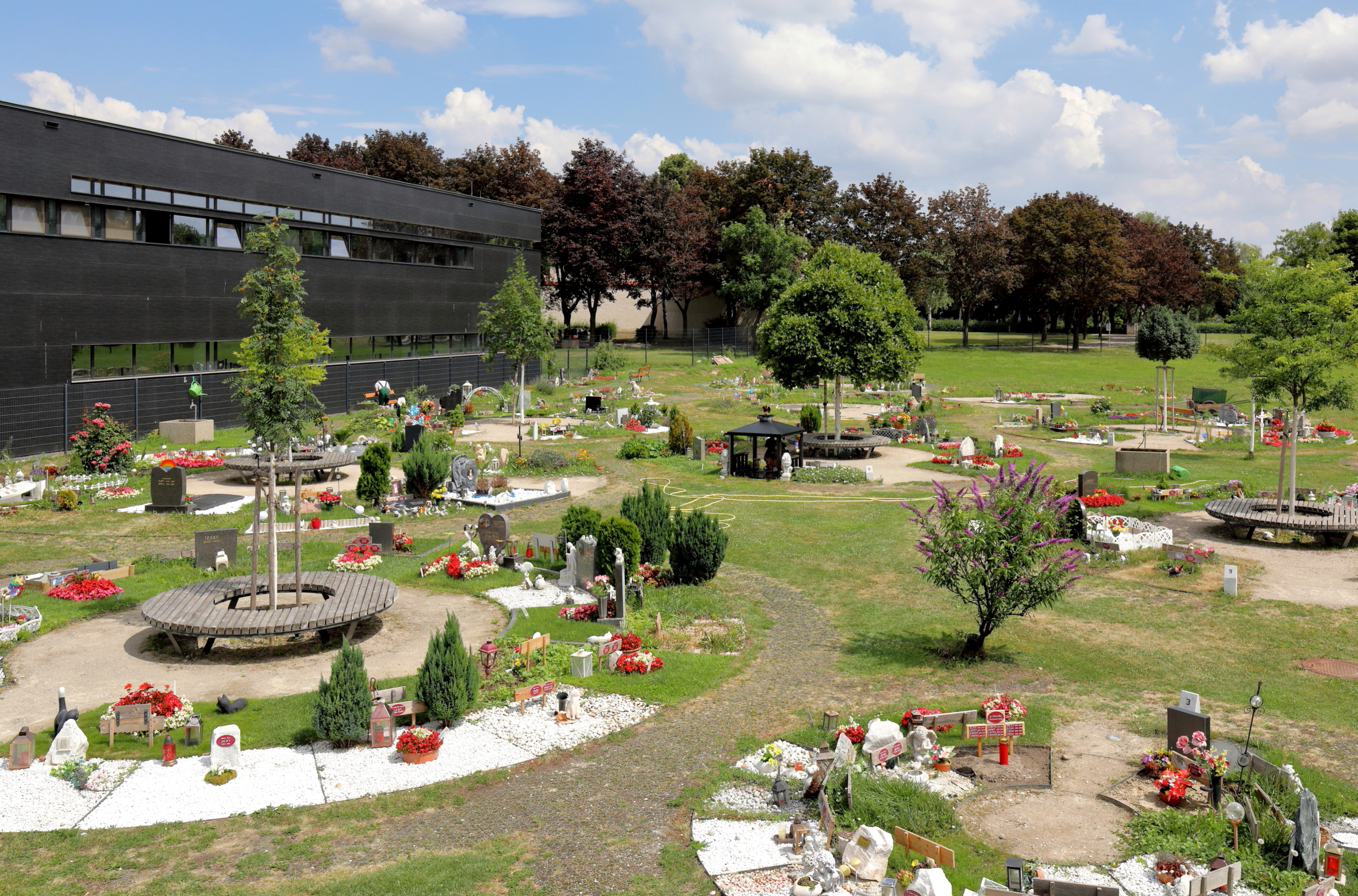
Pet cemetery in Vienna, Austria

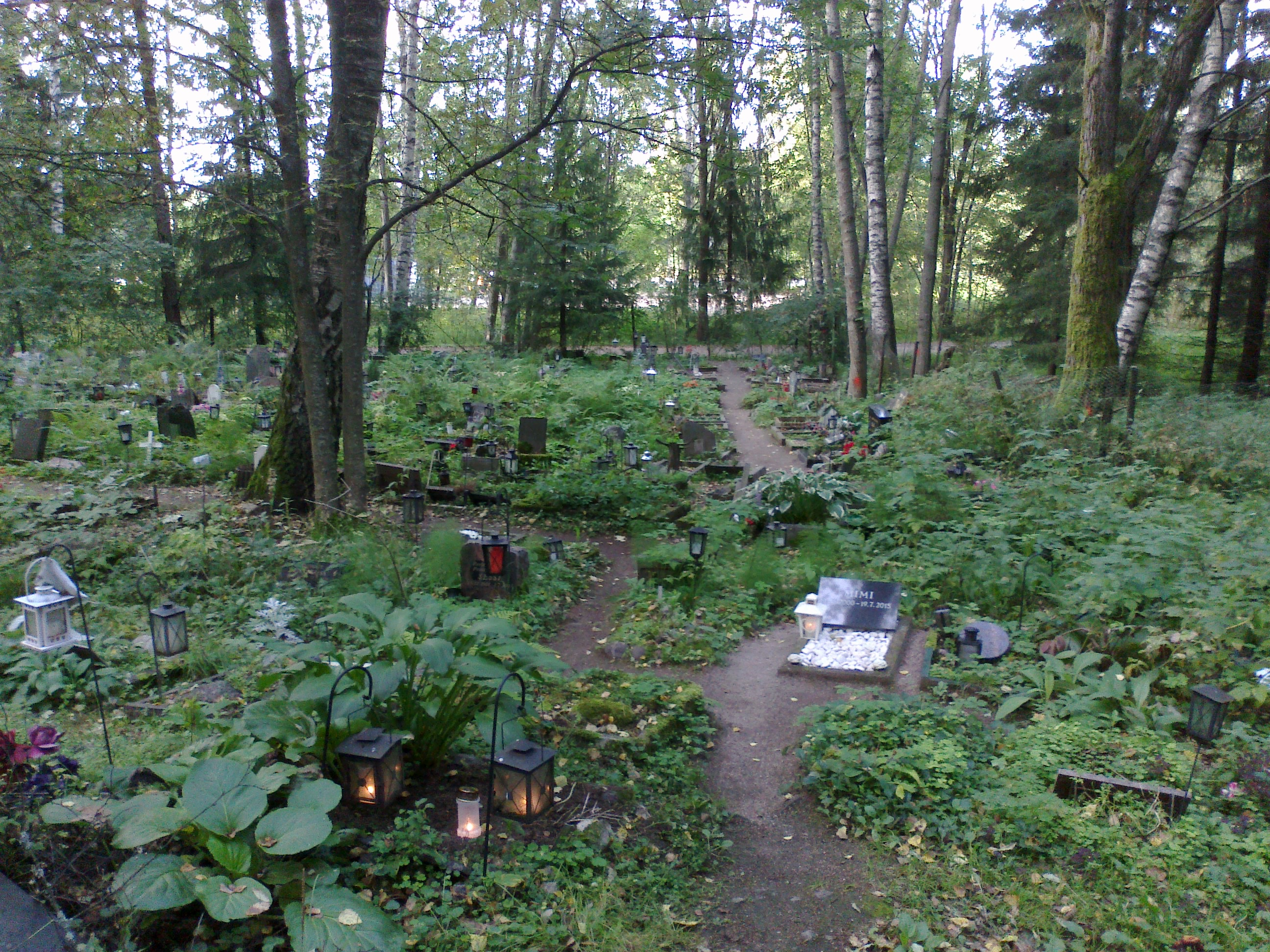
Pet cemetery in Helsinki, Finland

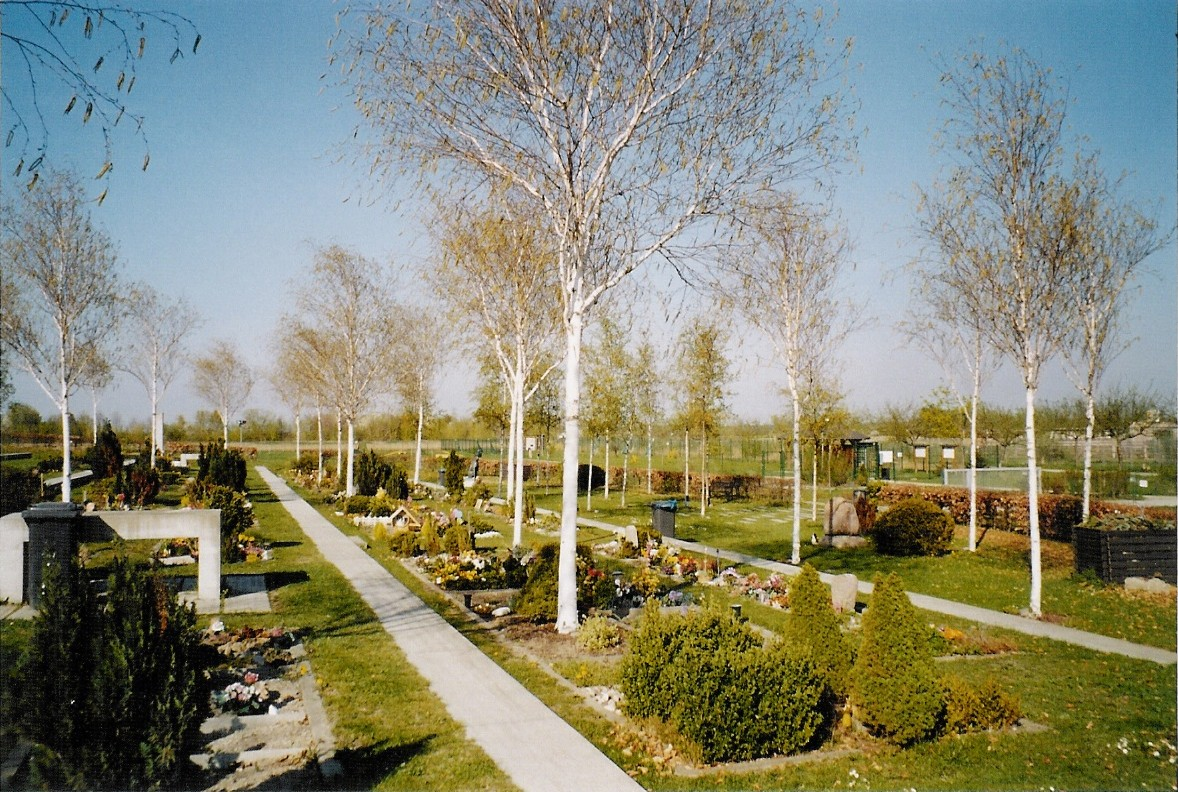
Pet cemetery in Berlin, Germany

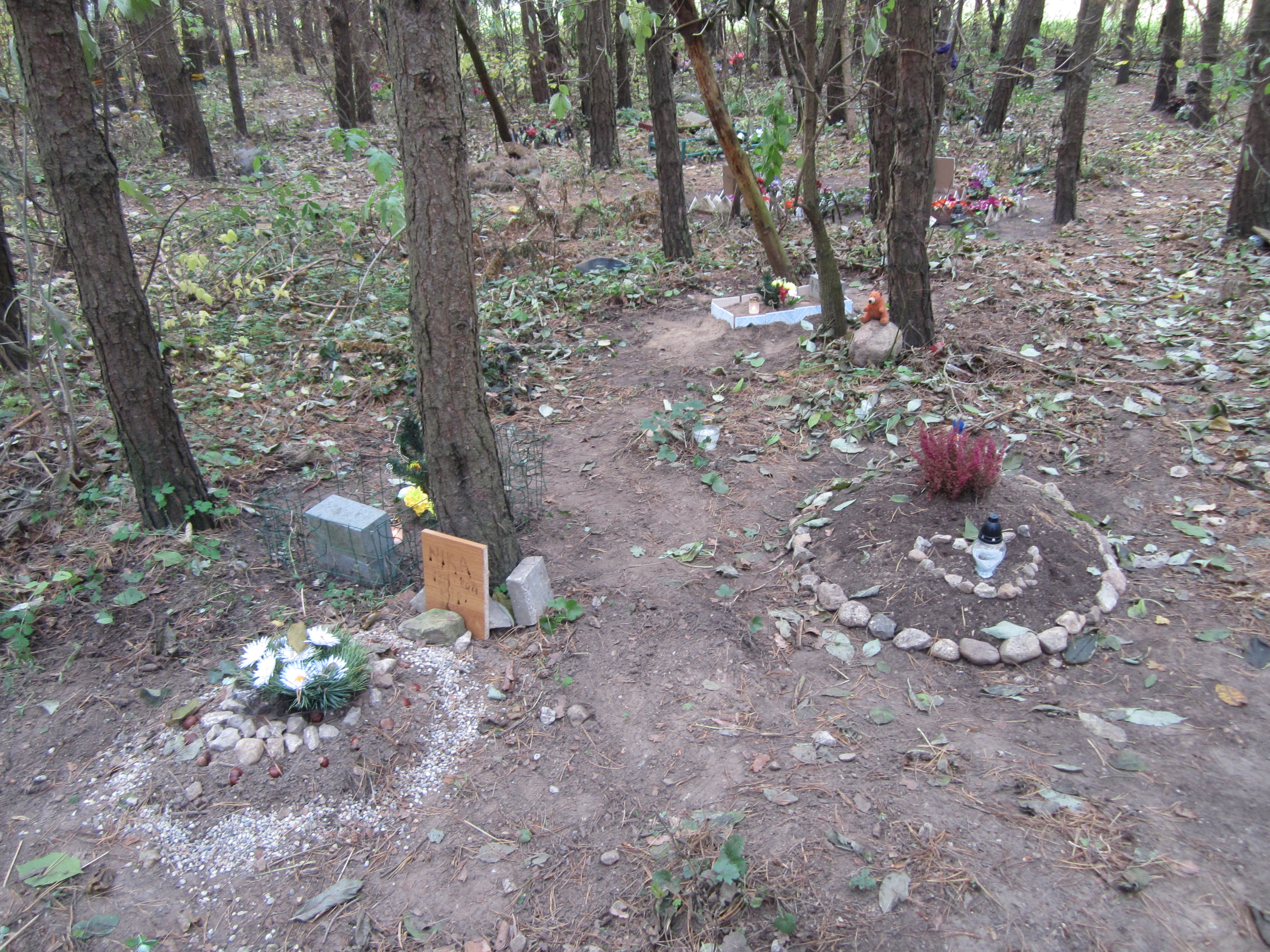
Pet cemetery in Vilnius, Lithuania

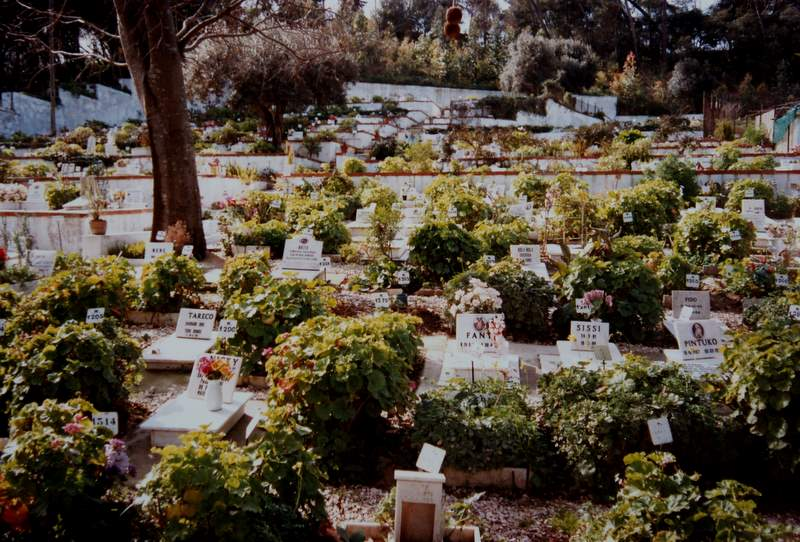
Pet cemetery in Lisbon, Portugal

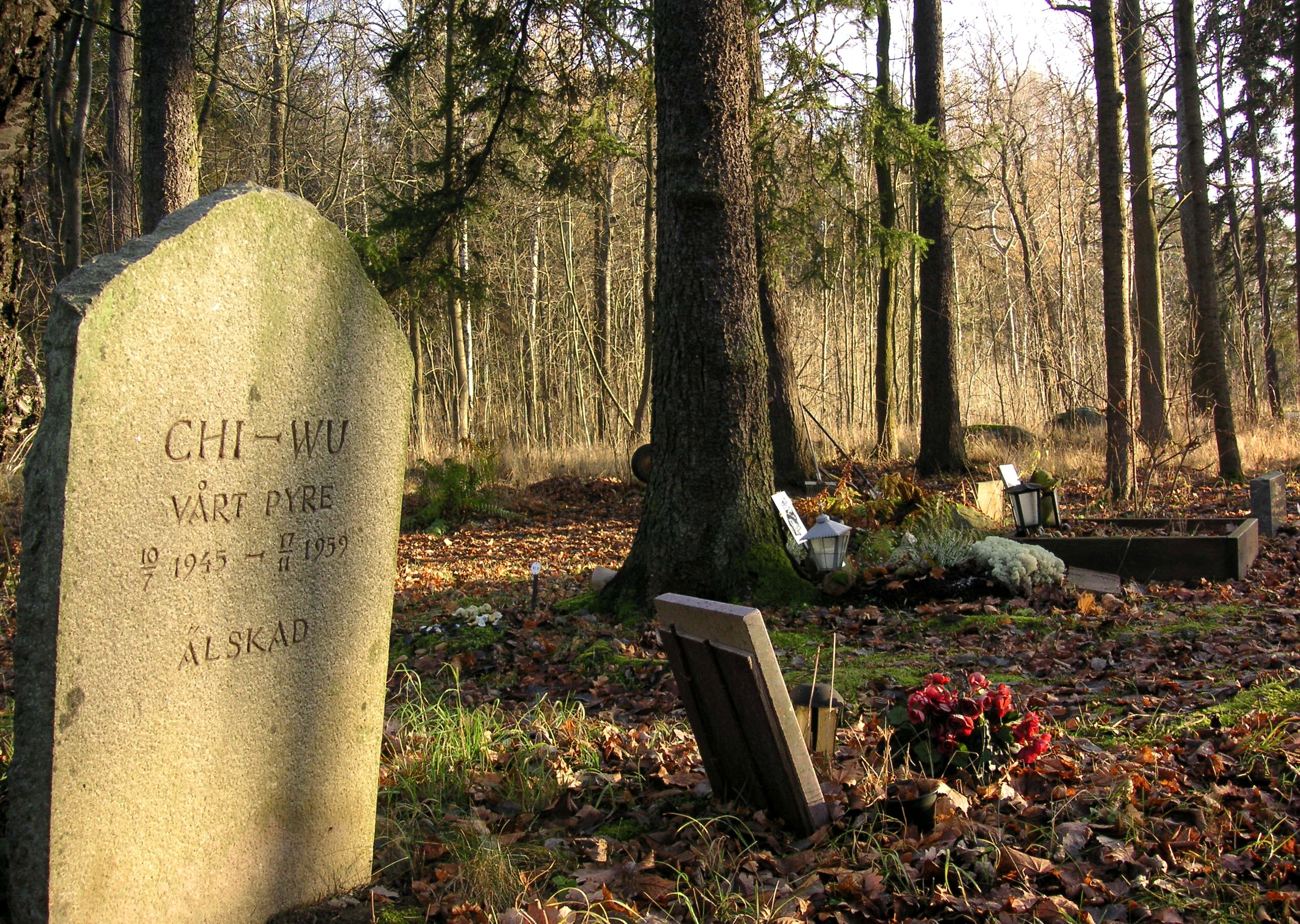
Pet cemetery in Stockholm, Sweden

=== North America ===
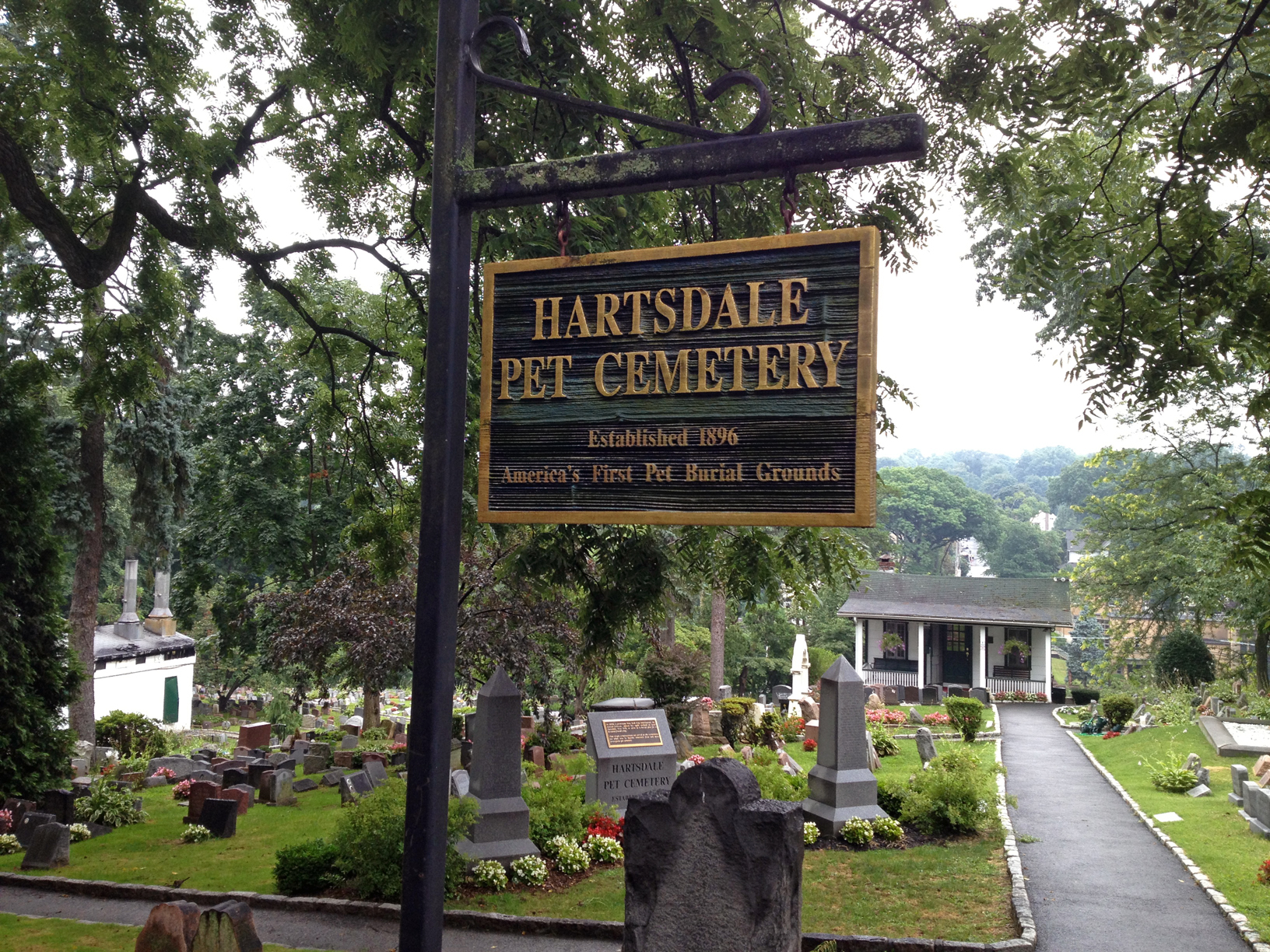

=== Oceania ===
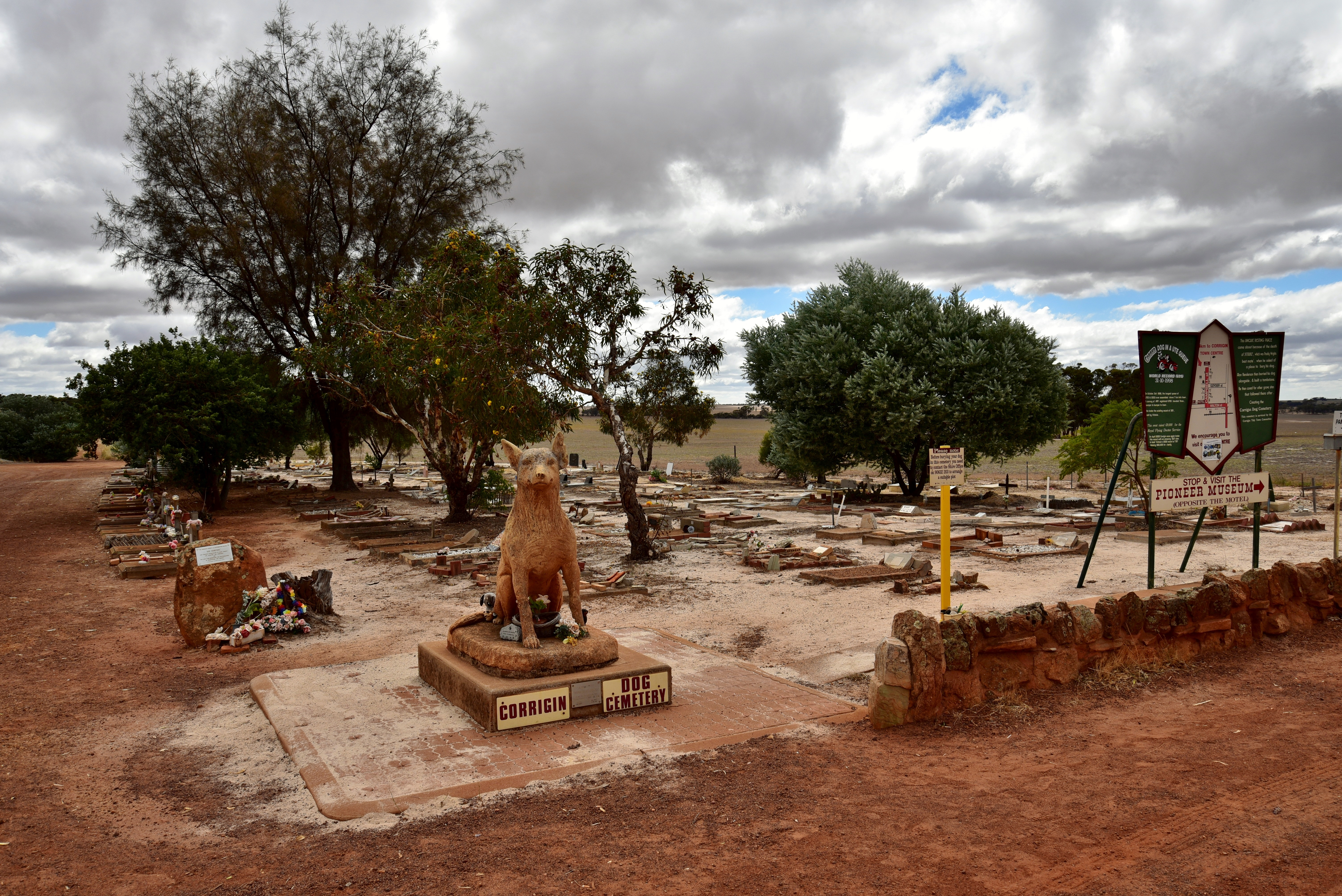
Corrigin Dog Cemetery in Corrigin, Western Australia

== See also ==
- Animal loss
- Pet humanization
- Pet Sematary – 1983 novel by Stephen King
