= The Tiger Next Door =

2009 film

- Directed by: Camilla Calamandrei
- Produced by: Camilla Calamandrei
- Cinematography: Tamara Goldsworthy; Dana Kupper
- Edited by: Bernadine Colish
- Music by: Joel Goodman
- Distributed by: Films Transit International (Montreal, Quebec, Canada)
- Release date: May 8, 2009
- Running time: 86 minutes
- Language: English

The Tiger Next Door is a feature-length 2009 documentary film directed and produced by Camilla Calamandrei.

== Synopsis ==
The film is a character-driven documentary, which also reveals and explores a subculture of large wild animal keeping and breeding across the United States. The film starts from the premise that there are more tigers in private hands in the United States than there are roaming wild in the world. And, that it is legal in half of the United States to keep a tiger or other big cat. The Tiger Next Door follows the story of a man named Dennis Hill who has been keeping and breeding tigers from his backyard in Flat Rock, Indiana for over 15 years. When the film begins, Hill has recently lost his federal USDA license to keep and breed tigers, bears and cougars and the Indiana Department of Natural Resources is threatening to shut him down citing dangerous and inhumane conditions. Hill has five days remaining to upgrade his facilities and place all but three of his 24 tigers, three bears, six leopards and one cougar in alternate homes—before the Indiana DNR will consider issuing licenses for the remaining three animals.

The 86 minute film explores Hill's past and his motivations, as well as the numerous incidence of private large wild animal breeding in the United States—by featuring extensive interviews with Hill, his family, neighbors and friends, local DNR officials, Special Agent Tim Santel of US Fish and Wildlife, Joe Taft director of the Exotic Feline Rescue Center, and Carole Asvestas director of Wild Animal Orphanage. Ultimately, The Tiger Next Door draws connections between breeders like Hill and the nationwide overpopulation of domestically bred tigers. Hill's unfolding story is told against the backdrop of other news stories of tiger escapes, attacks and situations "gone bad" from around the United States. Including the story of Ming, the tiger who was found in an apartment in Harlem, New York in 2003.

Filming for The Tiger Next Door began in 2003. The film debuted at the 2009 Hot Docs Film Festival in Toronto, Ontario, Canada. This is Calamandrei's second feature-length documentary. Her first feature documentary Prisoners in Paradise dealt with the story of Italian Prisoners of war held in the United States as POWs during World War II. It won Best of Festival at the Rhode Island International Film Festival in 2001 and was broadcast on PBS. Her first film, a short about ballroom dancing, premiered at Sundance Film Festival in 1990. Calamandrei is also the producer/director of live action segments for the Jim Henson/PBS children's show Sid the Science Kid.

== Critics' responses ==
- Eye Weekly April 29, 2009 —“…an affectionate profile, a damning exposé, and an urgent missive about the dire status of the magnificent animals stalking the edges of the frame. – Adam Nayman
- AOL Canada April 23, 2009 – 4 stars — It’s one thing to have a ferret, but quite another to have upwards of 60 exotic animals, including several tigers, black bears, and cougars confined in cages in your backyard. In Camilla Calamandrei’s unsettling film, we get a front-row glimpse into the life of Dennis H., a former meth addict, felon, and biker, whose apparent ‘dedication’ to the animals clouds people's judgement. Not for the animal lover, this film questions the fine line between compassion and obsession. – Chris Jancelewicz
- NUVO July 15, 2009 – TOP PICK – It's a must-see, as a detailed character study and piece of vigilant reportage. – Scott Shoger
- Flare – "This movie was just downright disturbing... a must see"
- Now – "fascinating, infuriating ...a great story told with intelligence, compassion and some amazing footage." - N. Wilner
- The Huffington Post - "Beautifully made… A seamless narrative that challenges thinking adults."

== Distribution ==
The Tiger Next Door has been licensed for television broadcast in the United States 2009-2015 by Animal Planet (Discovery Communications). US television broadcast premiere of a shortened version of the film was scheduled for March 25, 2010. The film has also been licensed for broadcast in Israel, Japan (NHK), Belgium, Canada (TVO) and Latin America (LAPTV Latin). The full length, feature documentary (and bonus material) is now available on DVD at The Tiger Next Door website.

== Film festivals ==
- Woodstock Film Festival
- Sidewalk Film Festival
- Atlantic Film Festival
- Movies On The Grass
- Indianapolis International Film Festival
- Hot Docs Canadian International Documentary Festival
- Margaret Mead Film Festival
- Big Sky Documentary Film Festival
- Lake County Film Festival
- Florida Film Festival

== Television broadcasts ==
US Television Premiere (43min min version) Animal Planet Thursday, March 25, 2010, 9pm EST/PST (8pm CST)

== See also ==
- Exotic pet
- Fatal Attractions, an Animal Planet series on injuries and deaths due to exotic pet ownership
- Tiger King
