= Aspin Hill Memorial Park =

Pet cemetery in Maryland, United States

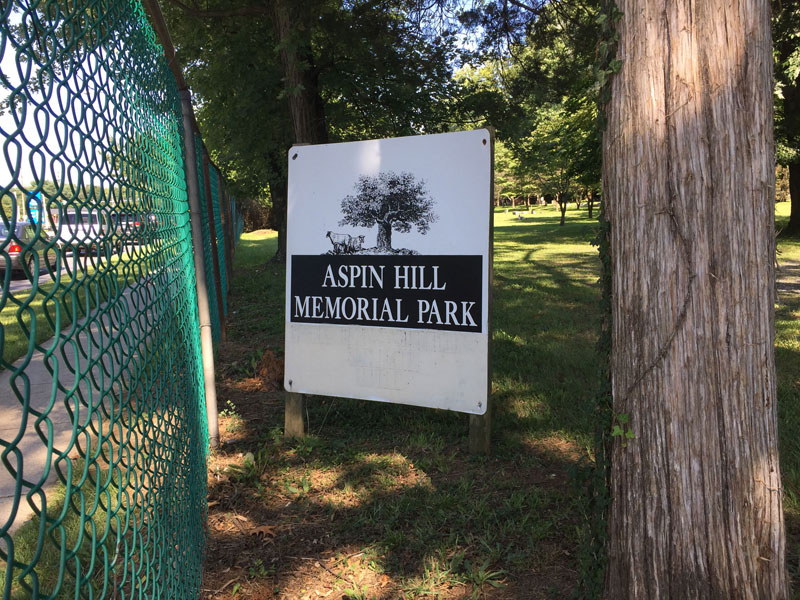
- Entrance Sign, Aspin Hill Memorial Park

Details
- Established: 1920
- Location: 13630 Georgia Avenue, Silver Spring, Maryland 20906
- Country: U.S.
- Coordinates: 39°04′46″N 77°04′36″W
- Type: Pet cemetery
- Owned by: Montgomery County Humane Society
- Size: 7.79 acres (3.15 ha)
- No. of interments: > 50,000
- Website: www.mchumane.org/aspin-hill
- Find a Grave: Aspin Hill Memorial Park

Aspin Hill Memorial Park, also known as Aspin Hill Pet Cemetery, is a pet cemetery located in Aspen Hill, Maryland, at the intersection of Georgia Avenue and Aspen Hill Road, 7.5 miles (12.1 km) north of Washington, D.C. The cemetery contains more than 50,000 pet burials, and more than 50 human burials. Aspin Hill Memorial Park is a designated individual site on Montgomery County, Maryland's Master Plan for Preservation.

Established in 1920, it is the fifth oldest pet cemetery in continuous operation in the United States. Hartsdale Pet Cemetery, established in 1896, is the oldest, followed by Pine Ridge Pet Cemetery (1907), Francisvale Home for Smaller Animals Pet Cemetery (1909), and Hillside Acre Animal Cemetery at Nevins Farm (1917).

== History ==
Richard and Bertha Birney purchased property in July 1920, so they could breed Boston terriers, board other people's dogs, and establish a pet cemetery. Although it was located in the town of Aspen, later known as Aspen Hill, the Birneys christened their new property "Aspin Hill," after a notable English kennel with the same name. The Birneys' breeding and boarding enterprise was called "Aspin Hill Kennels" and the cemetery was originally called "Aspin Hill Cemetery for Pet Animals." The first pet burial, a St. Bernard, took place a month after they purchased the property. By 1925, there were nearly 500 animals buried there.

=== Ownership of the cemetery ===
- 1920–1944: Richard and Bertha Birney. The Birneys died in 1944, a few months apart.
- 1944–1946: The Birney's heirs
- 1946–1988: Edgar Ruebush, a veterinarian. He was a silent partner in the pet cemetery business, which was run by:
  - 1944–1961 George and Gertrude Young
  - 1961–1985 S. Alfred Nash (who died in 1974) and his wife Martha.
- 1988–1996: People for the Ethical Treatment of Animals (PETA)
- 1996–2007: Chesapeake Wildlife Sanctuary
- 2007 – : Montgomery County Humane Society

=== Notable burials ===
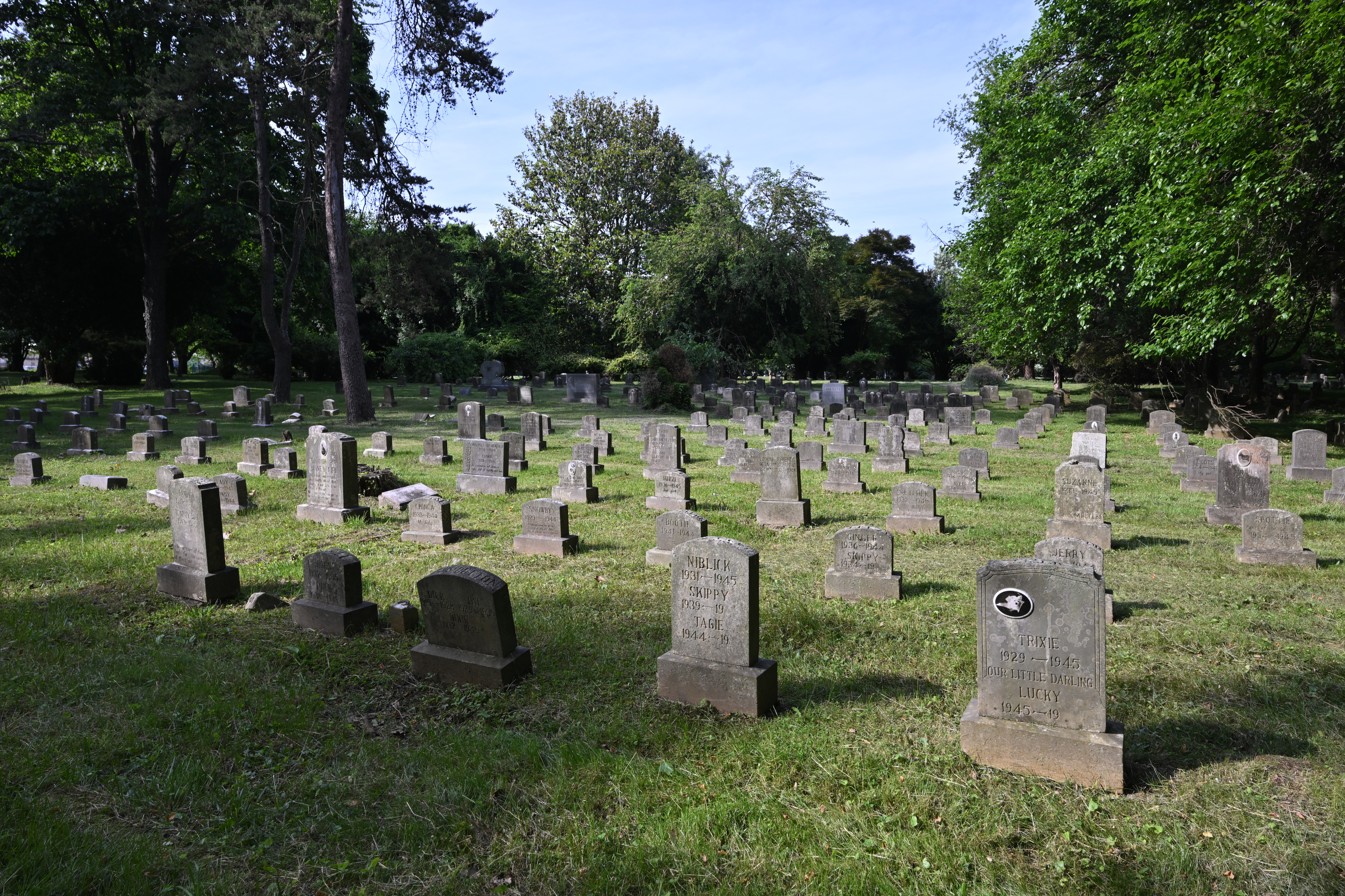
Grave markers at Aspin Hill Memorial Park

Spee De Bozo: J. Edgar Hoover's dog. Several other dogs belonging to Hoover are buried in the same plot.

Rags: U.S. 1st Infantry Division's mascot during World War I. His heroics during the Meuse Argonne Campaign saved many lives. After the war, Rags was brought to the U.S. When he became old and frail, his owners boarded him at Aspin Hill where he died and was buried.

General Grant of R.K.O.: Also known as "Jiggs," he was misidentified in the 1960s as being "Petey" from the Our Gang film series. He was briefly owned by Franklin D. Roosevelt, who gave him to a married couple, Arthur and Gabrielle Forbush, who worked for his administration. Because "R.K.O." was in General Grant's AKC-registered name, it was assumed that he was a dog actor. However, R.K.O. Studios had no affiliation with the Our Gang films. Seen by the photo on his gravestone, General Grant of R.K.O. was an English bulldog. Petey was an American pit bull terrier.

Napoleon, the Weather Prophet of Baltimore: Napoleon was the white Persian cat of Fanny deShields of Baltimore, Maryland. Whenever Napoleon switched from sleeping on his side to sleeping on his stomach with his paws on either side of his head, it would rain within 24 hours. Napoleon rose to fame because he correctly predicted the end of a troublesome drought in the region during the summer of 1930. From that point, until his death, Mrs. deShields fielded telephone calls from local farmers and people planning outdoor events wanting to know in what position Napoleon was sleeping.

Gypsy: Gypsy was the capuchin monkey of Eddie Bernstein, a legless panhandler who frequented the upscale shopping district of Northwest Washington, D.C. for over 40 years, starting in the mid-1930s. Gypsy died in 1976, and is buried at Aspin Hill. Three years later, Eddie died unexpectedly in Florida. It was discovered that his estate was worth over US$690,000 (equivalent to $2,989,370 in 2024).

== Future plans ==
Montgomery County Humane Society has filed an application to develop the Aspin Hill property as their new headquarters. The construction would occur on the two-plus acres of the cemetery property where the previous owners used to live and run their kennel, and where there have never been any burials. The society also plans to improve the cemetery.
