= Rags (dog) =

WWI mascot dog

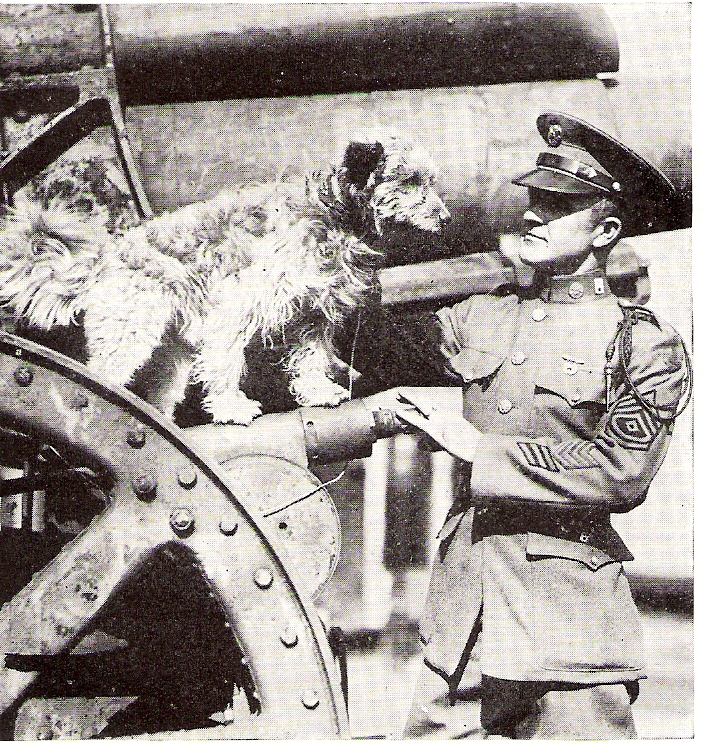
- Rags at Fort Hamilton in the 1920s
- Species: Canis lupus familiaris
- Breed: Mixed breed terrier
- Sex: Male
- Born: c. 1916
- Died: 3 March 1936 (aged 19–20); Washington, D.C., US
- Resting place: Silver Spring, Maryland, US
- Occupation: War dog
- Known for: Mascot of U.S. 1st Infantry Division
- Tricks: Saluted every time he saw soldiers on parade. This was a trick Donovan taught him in France.
- Owners: James "Jimmy" Donovan; Major Raymond W. Hardenbergh

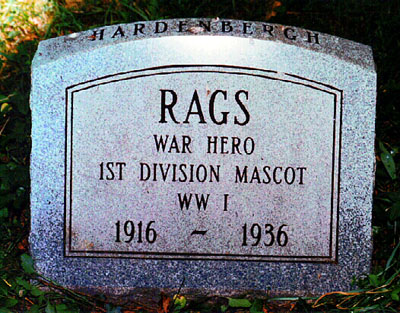
Rags' grave in Silver Spring, Maryland.

Rags (c. 1916 – March 6, 1936) was a mixed breed terrier who became the U.S. 1st Infantry Division's dog-mascot in World War I.

He was adopted into the 1st Division on July 14, 1918, in the Montmartre section of Paris, France. Rags remained its mascot until his death in Washington, D.C., on March 22, 1936. He learned to run messages between the rear headquarters and the front lines, and provided early warning of incoming shells. Rags achieved great notoriety and celebrity war dog fame when he saved many lives in the Meuse-Argonne Campaign by delivering a vital message despite being bombed, gassed, and partially blinded. His adopted owner and handler, Private James Donovan, was seriously wounded and gassed, dying after returning to a military hospital at Fort Sheridan in Chicago. Rags was adopted by the family of Major Raymond W. Hardenbergh there in 1920, moving with them through several transfers until in Fort Hamilton, New York, he was reunited with members of the 18th Infantry Regiment who had known him in France. Rags was presented with a number of medals and awards.

== Adoption in Paris ==
Rags was found abandoned on the streets of Paris by an American doughboy, Private James Donovan, an A.E.F. signal corps specialist serving with the U.S. 1st Infantry Division. Donovan named the dog Rags, having mistaken him for a pile of them when he first found him. Donovan had marched in the Bastille Day parade and was late in reporting back to his unit. To avoid being Absent Without Leave, Donovan told Military Police that Rags was the missing mascot of the 1st Infantry Division and that he was part of a search party. That is a role that Rags was to play for almost twenty years. Upon returning to his unit Donovan escaped punishment and was allowed to keep Rags largely because Donovan was being ordered to the front lines.

== War service ==
Donovan's job in the front lines was to string communications wire between advancing infantry and supporting field artillery. He also had to repair field telephone wires that had been damaged by shellfire. Until wire was replaced, runners had to be used, but they were frequently wounded, killed or could not get through shell holes and barbed wire. Donovan trained Rags to carry written messages attached to his collar.

In July 1918, Rags and Donovan and an infantry unit of 42 men were cut off and surrounded by Germans. Rags carried back a message which resulted in an artillery barrage and reinforcements that rescued the group. News of the exploit spread throughout the 1st Division.

In September 1918, Rags and Donovan were involved in the final American campaign of the war. Rags carried a number of messages and on October 2, 1918, carried one from the 1st Battalion of the 26th Infantry Regiment to the 7th Field Artillery that resulted in an artillery barrage that led to an important objective, the Very-Epinonville Road, being secured. It saved the lives of a large number of doughboys.

On October 9, 1918, Rags and Donovan were both the victims of German shellfire and gas shells. Rags had his right front paw, right ear and right eye damaged by shell splinters, and was also mildly gassed. Donovan was more seriously wounded and badly gassed. The two were kept together and taken back to a dressing station and then several different hospitals. Whenever this unusual treatment for a mere dog was mentioned, the term "orders from headquarters" was brought into play. Rags' reputation helped smooth the way. The dog quickly healed after excellent treatment. Donovan's health, however, grew worse. Both were returned to the United States.

== Return to the United States ==
Members of the 1st Division smuggled Rags by train and ship from Brest in France to Fort Sheridan in Chicago. He accompanied James Donovan, who was placed in the Fort Sheridan Base Hospital, which specialized in gas cases. Rags made his home at the base firehouse and was given a collar with a tag that identified him as 1st Division Rags.

In early 1919, Donovan died and Rags became the post dog, living in the firehouse and eating at various mess halls that he carefully selected. He was watched over by a number of soldiers on the post.

In 1920, Major Raymond W. Hardenbergh, his wife and two daughters arrived at Fort Sheridan. The family and Rags were soon very attached to each other. The post commander arranged for the family to be given the trusteeship of Rags. After several other tours of duty, the Hardenbergh family arrived at Governors Island in New York Harbor in 1924. The 16th Infantry Regiment of the 1st Division was stationed there and a number had served in World War I and were familiar with Rags and his exploits. He started his ritual of tours and soon was traveling by ferry to Fort Hamilton, Fort Wadsworth and the Army Building at Whitehall Street in downtown Manhattan.

He became a well-known New York City celebrity. The New York Times carried a number of articles about him. Jack Rohan's book about him was published in 1930. More newspaper and magazine articles followed. Rags was presented with a number of medals and awards. In 1928, he marched down Broadway with the 1st Division troops as part of the division's 10th anniversary of World War I reunion. Numerous New York politicians and U.S. Army generals had their pictures taken with Rags. From 1928 until 1934, Rags lived with the Hardenberghs at Fort Hamilton.

== Death ==
In 1934, Hardenbergh, by then a lieutenant colonel, was transferred to Washington, D.C., to serve in the War Department. Little is known of Rags over the next two years. In March 1936, Hardenbergh informed Fort Hamilton and the 1st Division that Rags had died. He was 20 years old. Rags was buried with military honors, and a monument was erected at the Aspin Hill Memorial Park in Silver Spring, Maryland near the Hardenbergh home.

== Unique behavior ==
In addition to his message-carrying skills in France during World War I, Rags had a number of other unique behaviors. When Rags was first in the front lines and came under shellfire, he simply imitated the men around him who would drop to the ground and hug it tightly. Before long, the soldiers observed Rags hugging the ground with his paws spread out before anyone heard the sound of an incoming round. The men soon realized that Rags' acute and sensitive hearing was telling them when the shells were coming well before they could hear them. The doughboys learned to keep their eyes on Rags, and he became an early-warning system for artillery shell fire. During a rest period behind the lines, James Donovan taught Rags a method of dog saluting that Rags would use for the rest of his military life. Instead of extending his paw out to shake hands, as most dogs were taught, Rags would raise his paw a bit higher and close to his head. For many years afterward, Rags would appear at the flag pole at various military bases for the retreat ceremony. As the flag was lowered and the bugle played, Rags could be seen saluting with the assembled troops. He was observed doing this at Forts Sheridan and Hamilton. Another lifelong activity was Rags' daily tour of whatever army base at which he was living. Early on, he would identify the mess halls with the best food and most hospitable staff. He would visit them each day for treats, and most had a special water bowl placed out for him.

== See also ==
- Chips (dog)
- Lex (dog)
- Philly (dog)
- List of individual dogs
