= Exotic Feline Rescue Center =

Coordinates: 39.3937°N 87.0686°W

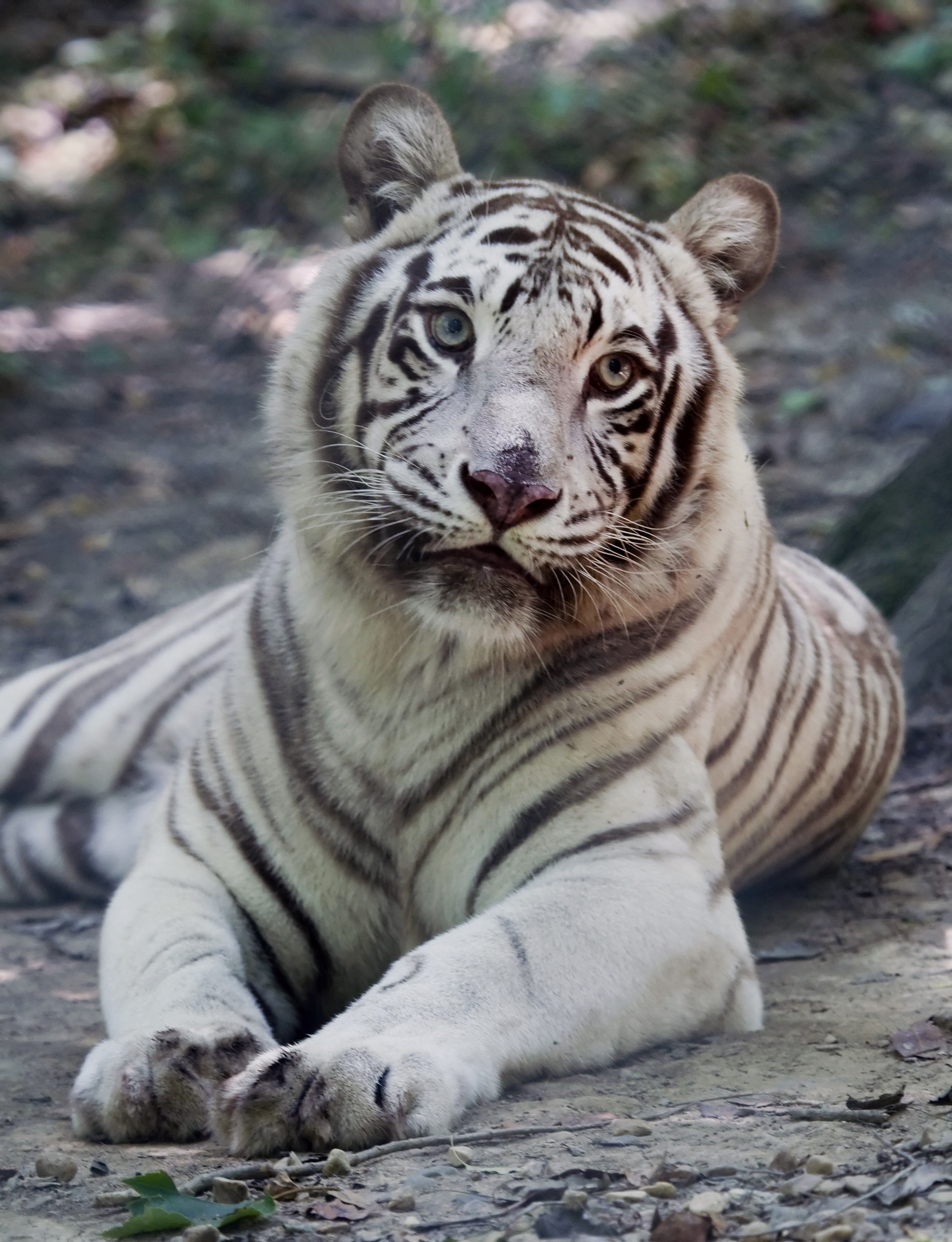
A blind white tiger at the Exotic Feline Rescue Center in 2009.

The Exotic Feline Rescue Center (EFRC) is a wildlife preserve for exotic felines in the United States established in 1991 and located in Center Point, Indiana.

== Overview ==
The EFRC is a 501(c)(3) tax-exempt charitable organization and the second-largest big cat rescue in the United States, spanning over 200 acres (0.81 km^{2}). Abused, disabled, and otherwise homeless wild cats such as Lions, tigers, leopards, servals, pumas, bobcats, Canada lynx, ocelots, Geoffroy's cat, and an Asian leopard cat have taken refuge in this organization. An on-site clinic provides veterinary care and education on big cats to the public. The EFRC does not buy, sell, or breed animals.

The EFRC is the focus of several books published by Indiana University Press, including Saving the Big Cats (2006) and Tales From the Exotic Feline Rescue Center (2016).

The EFRC was featured in the 2009 movie The Tiger Next Door and was the subject of a TV documentary in the same year.

== Research ==
Over a two-year period (2008–2009), Dr. Susan Linville at the Center for the Integrative Study of Animal Behavior (CISAB) and Dr. Helena Soini at the Institute for Pheromone Research, both located at Indiana University, conducted a research project with lions, tigers, cougars, and leopards at the EFRC to study rubbing behavior and the potential deposition of pheromones during the activity.

In 2009, a research project was conducted by several veterinarians from the University of Illinois Urbana-Champaign, College of Veterinary Medicine. Under the direction of Dr. Stuart Clark-Price, immobilization and anesthesia methods for tigers were assessed in order to optimize protocols and improve animal safety during anesthesia. During these procedures, veterinary ophthalmologists gathered routine measurements on the tigers' eyes to establish normal parameters for this species. Collected information was to be used to improve current therapies and establish a basis for the treatment of eye diseases in tigers. Dental examinations were also performed by The Peter Emily International Veterinary Dental Foundation to determine the current condition of each tiger's teeth and the potential need for future dental care. Any needed dental treatments were performed by board-certified veterinary dentists free of charge. Other information, including normal blood values and anti-body levels of different diseases were evaluated to improve the care of these tigers and to enhance global care for the species.

== Internships ==
The EFRC offers internships for college students and credit is offered for students at Indiana University through the Center for Integrative Study of Animal Behavior.

== Staff ==
- Director: Joe Taft
- Assistant Director: Jean Herrberg
- Head Keeper: Rebecca Rizzo

== Incidents ==
On June 21, 2013, a tiger mauled a caretaker who was cleaning its cage, biting her head during the attack. The unidentified 21-year-old woman was airlifted to Wishard Memorial Hospital and was in critical but non-life-threatening condition. As a result of the incident, the Indiana Occupational Safety and Health Administration conducted an inspection and, in November 2013, fined the center $56,000 for "knowing" violations and $13,000 for "serious" violations, including dangerous conditions likely to cause death or physical harm to employees. Three days after the incident, Ann Marie Houser, an animal care inspector from the USDA, visited the center to investigate. Houser noticed an issue with the enclosure door, a gap measuring 4 to 6 inches, which the facility benefactor, Taft, had attempted to fix with the use of a piece of rebar, a reinforcing bar. It was Houser's finding that this repair prohibited the cage from functioning properly in an emergency.
