= Racine, Minnesota =

City in Minnesota, United States

- City
- Location in Mower County and the state of Minnesota
- Coordinates: 43°46′32″N 92°28′51″W
- Country: United States
- State: Minnesota
- County: Mower

Area
  - Total: 0.67 sq mi (1.73 km^{2})
  - Land: 0.67 sq mi (1.73 km^{2})
  - Water: 0 sq mi (0.00 km^{2})
- Elevation: 1,296 ft (395 m)

Population (2020)
  - Total: 458
  - Density: 685.8/sq mi (264.77/km^{2})
- Time zone: UTC-6 (Central (CST))
  - Summer (DST): UTC-5 (CDT)
- ZIP code: 55967
- Area code: 507
- FIPS code: 27-52882
- GNIS feature ID: 2396304

Racine (/reɪˈsiːn/ ray-SEEN) is a city in Mower County, Minnesota, United States. The population was 458 at the 2020 census.

== History ==
Racine was platted in 1890.

== Geography ==
Racine is in northeastern Mower County, surrounded by Racine Township but independent from it. U.S. Route 63 passes through the west side of the city, leading north 5 miles (8 km) to Stewartville and southeast 10 miles (16 km) to Spring Valley. Austin, the Mower county seat, is 30 miles (48 km) to the southwest.

According to the U.S. Census Bureau, Racine has a total area of 0.67 square miles (1.74 km^{2}), all land. It is drained to the east by unnamed tributaries of Bear Creek, part of the Root River watershed flowing to the Mississippi River.

== Demographics ==
Historical population
Census	Pop.	Note	%±
1960	180		—
1970	197		9.4%
1980	285		44.7%
1990	288		1.1%
2000	355		23.3%
2010	442		24.5%
2020	458		3.6%
U.S. Decennial Census

=== 2010 census ===
As of the census of 2010, there were 442 people, 157 households, and 122 families living in the city. The population density was 659.7 inhabitants per square mile (254.7/km^{2}). There were 166 housing units at an average density of 247.8 per square mile (95.7/km^{2}). The racial makeup of the city was 98.9% White, 0.2% African American, and 0.9% from two or more races. Hispanic or Latino of any race were 1.4% of the population.

There were 157 households, of which 42.0% had children under the age of 18 living with them, 65.6% were married couples living together, 5.7% had a female householder with no husband present, 6.4% had a male householder with no wife present, and 22.3% were non-families. 17.2% of all households were made up of individuals, and 6.4% had someone living alone who was 65 years of age or older. The average household size was 2.82 and the average family size was 3.20.

The median age in the city was 35 years. 30.5% of residents were under the age of 18; 5.8% were between the ages of 18 and 24; 31.4% were from 25 to 44; 22.9% were from 45 to 64; and 9.3% were 65 years of age or older. The gender makeup of the city was 51.1% male and 48.9% female.

=== 2000 census ===
As of the census of 2000, there were 355 people, 121 households, and 94 families living in the city. The population density was 804.4 inhabitants per square mile (310.6/km^{2}). There were 123 housing units at an average density of 278.7 per square mile (107.6/km^{2}). The racial makeup of the city was 99.15% White, 0.56% African American, and 0.28% from two or more races.

There were 121 households, out of which 43.0% had children under the age of 18 living with them, 70.2% were married couples living together, 5.8% had a female householder with no husband present, and 22.3% were non-families. 15.7% of all households were made up of individuals, and 7.4% had someone living alone who was 65 years of age or older. The average household size was 2.93 and the average family size was 3.31.

In the city, the population was spread out, with 30.4% under the age of 18, 7.3% from 18 to 24, 34.1% from 25 to 44, 20.3% from 45 to 64, and 7.9% who were 65 years of age or older. The median age was 33 years. For every 100 females, there were 91.9 males. For every 100 females age 18 and over, there were 102.5 males.

The median income for a household in the city was $53,750, and the median income for a family was $58,125. Males had a median income of $36,607 versus $28,958 for females. The per capita income for the city was $19,755. None of the population or families were below the poverty line.

== Notable residents ==
- Ming of Harlem, a tiger that was born in Racine
