= Racine Township, Mower County, Minnesota =

Racine Township, Minnesota
- Township
- Location within the state of Minnesota Racine Township, Minnesota (the United States)
- Coordinates: 43°46′51″N 92°31′10″W
- Country: United States
- State: Minnesota
- County: Mower

Area
  - Total: 35.9 sq mi (92.9 km^{2})
  - Land: 35.9 sq mi (92.9 km^{2})
  - Water: 0 sq mi (0.0 km^{2})
- Elevation: 1,296 ft (395 m)

Population (2000)
  - Total: 445
  - Density: 12/sq mi (4.8/km^{2})
- Time zone: UTC-6 (Central (CST))
  - Summer (DST): UTC-5 (CDT)
- ZIP code: 55967
- Area code: 507
- FIPS code: 27-52900
- GNIS feature ID: 0665371

Racine Township is a township in Mower County, Minnesota, United States. The population was 445 at the time of the 2000 census. The largest town in the township is Racine with a population of 442 as of the 2010 census. All other area in the township is unincorporated.

== History ==
Racine Township was organized in 1858. The old village of Hamilton was once located about two miles southeast of the town of Racine in the northeast corner of section 1 (the east half of the village was in Fillmore County).

== Geography ==
According to the United States Census Bureau, the township has a total area of 35.9 square miles (93.0 km^{2}), all land.

== Demographics ==
At the 2000 census, there were 445 people, 165 households and 128 families residing in the township. The population density was 12.4 per square mile (4.8/km^{2}). There were 175 housing units at an average density of 4.9/sq mi (1.9/km^{2}). The racial makeup of the township was 98.88% White, 0.22% African American, 0.22% Asian, and 0.67% from two or more races. Hispanic or Latino of any race were 0.45% of the population.

There were 165 households, of which 34.5% had children under the age of 18 living with them, 68.5% were married couples living together, 7.9% had a female householder with no husband present, and 22.4% were non-families. 17.0% of all households were made up of individuals, and 8.5% had someone living alone who was 65 years of age or older. The average household size was 2.70 and the average family size was 3.07.

25.2% of the population were under the age of 18, 8.3% from 18 to 24, 29.0% from 25 to 44, 25.8% from 45 to 64, and 11.7% who were 65 years of age or older. The median age was 38 years. For every 100 females, there were 109.9 males. For every 100 females age 18 and over, there were 109.4 males.

The median household income was $54,231 and the median family income was $55,833. Males had a median income of $34,375 and females $27,813. The per capita income was $23,320. About 0.7% of families and 1.2% of the population were below the poverty line, including none of those under age 18 and 3.4% of those age 65 or over.

== Cemeteries ==
- Salem Cemetery is located two miles southwest of Racine. Its oldest known burial dates to 1865.
- St. John's Evangelical Lutheran Cemetery is located in the southwest corner of the southeast quadrant of section 18 of the township. Its oldest known burial dates to 1876.
- There is also an unnamed, deserted cemetery located in the southeast corner of the southwest quadrant of section 23 of the township. It was in use from 1859 to 1874.
