= Drew-Hamilton Houses =

Public housing development in Manhattan, New York

- NYCHA Property
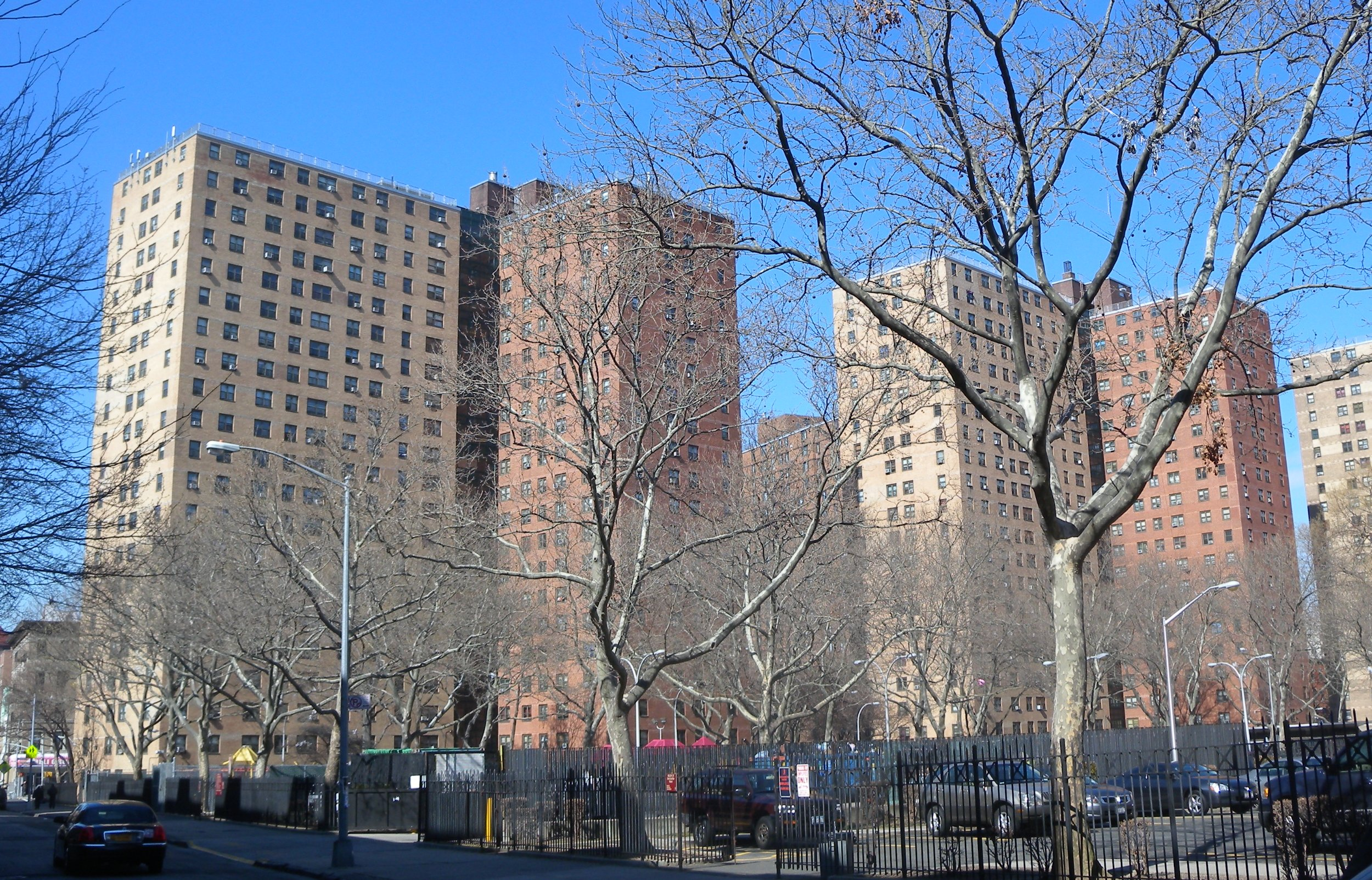
- Interactive map of Drew-Hamilton Houses
- Coordinates: 40.8206°N 73.9416°W
- Country: United States
- State: New York
- City: New York City
- Borough: Manhattan

Area
  - Total: 6.85 acres (2.77 ha)

Population
  - Total: 2,345
- Zip Code: 10030

Drew-Hamilton Houses are a public housing project owned by the New York City Housing Authority (NYCHA). The housing complex consists of five 21-story buildings. It is located between Frederick Douglass and Adam C. Powell Jr. Boulevards and also between West 142nd and 144th Streets in the Harlem neighborhood of Manhattan, New York City. The housing complex was completed in September 1965 and was named after Monsignor Cornelius J. Drew, the former pastor of St. Charles Borromeo Church, and Alexander Hamilton.

The complex was designed by the architectural firm of Katz, Waisman, Weber, Strauss. The five towers were sited along the boulevards and set at a diagonal; the center of the site includes several older buildings that were spared from the redevelopment project, including St. Charles Borromeo Church.

== See also ==
- New York City Housing Authority
- Ming of Harlem – tiger kept in an apartment at the complex from 2000 to 2003
