= Fatal Attractions (TV series) =

American documentary television program

- Genre: Documentary
- Created by: Joe Evans; Nigel Levy
- Narrated by: Jana Sheldon
- Theme music composer: Birger Clausen
- Country of origin: United States
- Original language: English
- No. of seasons: 3
- No. of episodes: 25

Production
- Executive producers: Caroline Hawkins; Erin Wanner
- Producer: Nigel Levy
- Running time: 44 minutes
- Production company: Oxford Scientific Films

Original release
- Network: Animal Planet
- Release: March 14, 2010 – February 22, 2013

Fatal Attractions is a documentary series broadcast on Animal Planet from 2010 until 2013. First aired in 2010, the show focused on humans who have kept animals as unconventional pets that have turned out to be dangerous and sometimes fatal. The program's last new episode aired in February 2013. No new episodes were made around the end date.

== Premise ==
Each episode contains stories of cases of either a species (chimpanzee, tiger) or a class (reptiles, big cats) of animals — referred to in the show as "exotic" — escaping and attacking their owners or those around them.

Each story within an episode is told through flashbacks and re-enactments, narrated by actress Jana Sheldon. Subject-matter experts (SMEs), along with family members and surviving attack victims (not counting deceased attack victims) are interviewed as part of the narrative.

== Episodes ==
A three-episode miniseries premiered in March 2010 served as the pilot for the program. Animal Planet ordered an additional four episodes, which began airing in October 2010. Another order was placed for four more episodes, which began airing in February 2011.

Each episode deals with two or three stories of people who keep animals as pets that are generally not meant to live in domestic environments and often are hostile to mankind in general. Episodes explore how these owners come to develop a psychological dependence on these animals, to the point of allowing themselves to get so close to these animals that the line between predator and prey becomes blurred or even non-existent. Episodes usually depict someone getting hurt or killed as a result of keeping exotic species as household pets. Each story is tied together at the end, as part of the overall theme of why wild animals should remain in the wild and not in backyards.

Many episodes deal with high-profile animal attack cases, such as the February 2009 mauling of Charla Nash by Travis, a 14-year-old chimpanzee who had lived as a pet for his entire life with Connecticut businesswoman Sandra Herold. Others deal with high-profile animal seizures, such as the finding of Ming, a Bengal tiger living in a Harlem apartment.

Occasionally, the subject-matter experts (SME for short) being interviewed for an episode relate first-hand stories of animal attraction nearly turning fatal for themselves or someone close to them.

- Herpetologist and former Cincinnati Zoo director of reptile care Winston Card, who appears as a SME in reptile-based episodes, recounted his personal role in one of the stories told in the program's first episode, "Reptiles". In October 2004, Card was contacted by the police requesting assistance from the Cincinnati Zoo in the search of a North College Hill, Ohio home belonging to Alexandria Hall. Hall had driven herself to a Cincinnati hospital and collapsed upon reaching the emergency room, managing to tell the doctors that she had been bitten by an urutu pit viper before she lost consciousness, dying two days later of a bleed in the brain. Card and a team of Cincinnati Zoo herpetologists discovered Hall was sharing her home with over a dozen illegally acquired snakes and lizards, including the urutu whose bite had killed her.
- Captive Wild Animal Protection Campaign (CWAPC) program director Josephine Martell, often used as a SME in the pilot miniseries episodes, described in the episode "Big Cats" the experience of witnessing a leopard biting the tip of an index finger off of an exotic cat owner. Martell related that, as she set out on the long drive from the owner's home in the Nevada desert to the nearest hospital emergency room, the owner suddenly seemed to have a rare moment of clarity about the dangers of owning exotic cats; the owner reportedly said, "I knew this would happen; this always happens to people who own these kind of animals," but just hours after the woman was stabilized in the hospital, she began to excuse the animal's behavior through language Martell describes as "the standard denial" many injured exotic animal owners use when describing how the injuries weren't the animal's fault: "She said the animal was just playing; the animal would never hurt her; the animal loved her; it was just some freak accident."
- In the same episode, Tammy Quist Thies, director of a Minnesota sanctuary for rescued exotic cats known as The Wildcat Sanctuary (TWS), related her connection to one of the episode's stories, the death of exotic cat trainer/exhibitor/breeder Cynthia Lee Gamble in April 2006. Gamble's operation, The Center for Endangered Cats (CEC), was located in Duxbury, Minnesota, only a few miles from TWS. The business side of CEC—providing trained wild animals for movies, TV, and public appearances—was on the decline after Gamble and her business partner, Craig Wagner, split in 2004; Gamble filed for bankruptcy shortly afterward. Rumors were circulating in the area that her collection of exotic cats were near starvation—including three Bengal tigers, the largest of which was a male named Tango that was later determined to be over 100 pounds (45 kg) underweight—and Gamble had been forced to seek out roadkill to feed her cats. When Thies learned that Gamble had been mauled and partially eaten by Tango (who had to be put down due to his extreme aggression), she offered to take in Gamble's remaining two tigers, and discovered that both of them were near starvation as well, with damaged and rotting teeth due to poor quality food and general malnutrition, along with high human aggression levels due to their state of starvation. Thies was able to return both cats to health, and both of their demeanors improved as well. Thies later learned that just weeks before her death, Gamble had reportedly told a friend that she was seriously considering contacting TWS and asking them to take all of her cats. "I wish, for her sake, that we could have all just done the right thing for the cats, and then she could have just moved on," Thies said.
- Herpetologist Jim Harrison of the Kentucky Reptile Zoo, used as a SME in several episodes dealing with snakes, is one of four herpetologists in the U.S. qualified to perform venom extraction from venomous snakes to produce the life-saving medication antivenin. His work extracting venom was filmed throughout the spring of 2009 for use as background footage in the reptile episodes. In May 2009, Harrison was bitten by one of his pit vipers; Harrison's wife videotaped his transport to the hospital and the treatment he received there. After Harrison left the hospital, the producers shot additional footage of him back at the Kentucky Reptile Zoo, still struggling with the effects of the snakebite as he returned to venom extraction. Harrison's bite and recovery became the subject of one of the stories told in the episode "My Pet Python".

A recurring theme throughout the program is the notion that when an exotic animal attack on a human results in a fatality to the human, it almost always results in an additional fatality. The animal involved in the attack, often simply exhibiting its hard-wired instincts or prey drive, usually has to be put down as well. Experts interviewed for the show explain that sometimes the killing of the animal is to prevent it from further attacks on humans; other times, the animal is euthanized in order to retrieve the body of the victim; still others are killed as routine legal procedure, applied to any animal that injures or kills a human, in order to perform a necropsy and test for diseases such as rabies. Thus, the human's attraction is just as likely, if not more so, to be fatal to the animal as well.

== See also ==
- Exotic animals
- Ming of Harlem
