= Hartsdale Pet Cemetery =

Historic cemetery in New York, United States

- U.S. National Register of Historic Places
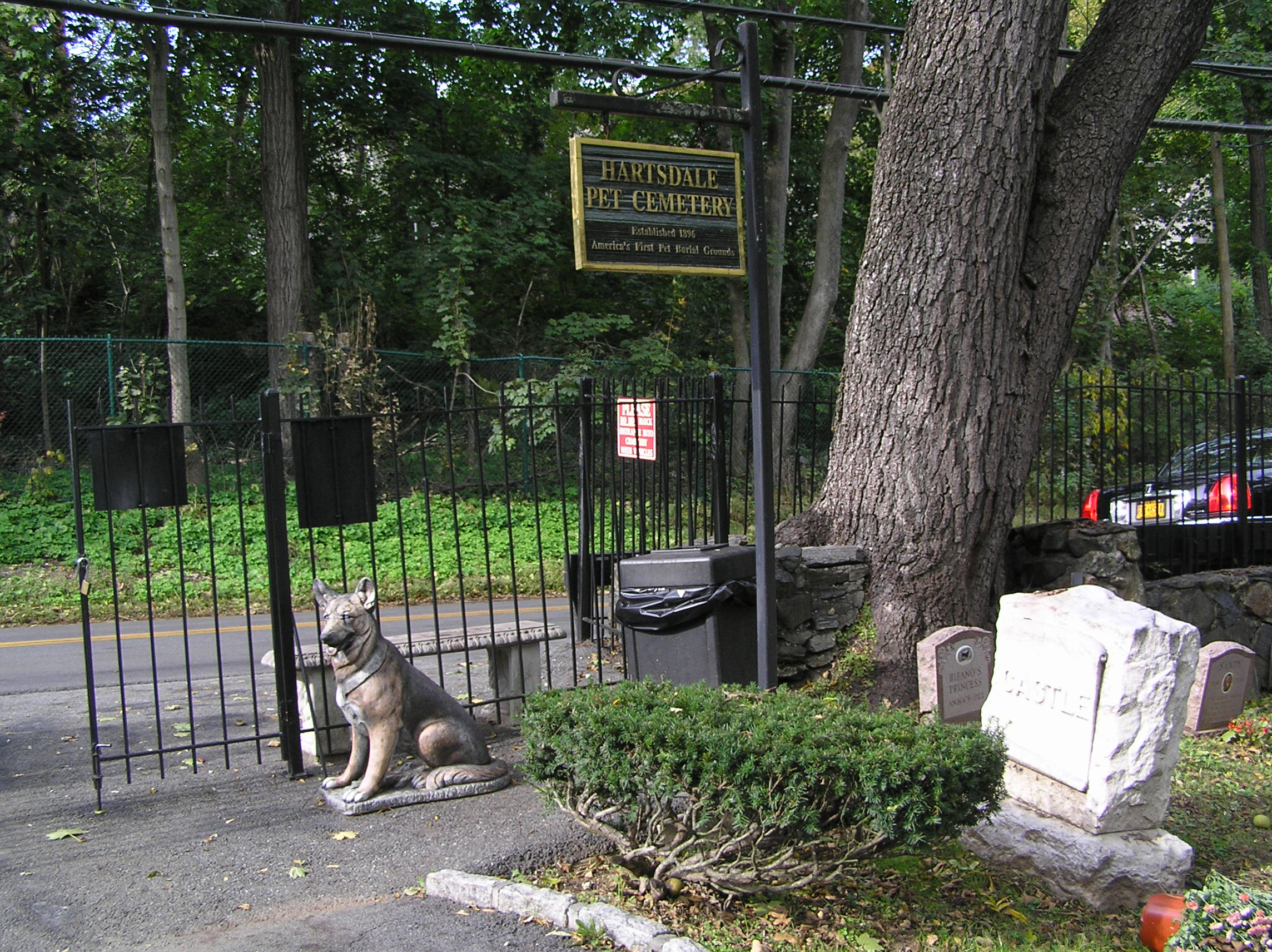
- Hartsdale Pet Cemetery, October 2012

- Location within New York Location within the United States
- Location: 75 N. Central Park Ave., Hartsdale, New York
- Coordinates: 41°01′17″N 73°47′49″W
- Area: 3.71 acres (1.50 ha)
- Built: 1896
- Architect: Samuel Johnson and Emily Berthet; John Logan
- NRHP reference No.: 12000535
- Added to NRHP: August 17, 2012

Hartsdale Pet Cemetery, also known as Hartsdale Canine Cemetery, is a historic pet cemetery located at Hartsdale, Westchester County, New York. It was established in 1896, and contains over 80,000 interments, with 14,000 interment lots and 7,000 memorials. Contributing resources include the groundskeeper's cottage, a house, a public memorial to the dogs of war, a mausoleum, and manmade and natural topographical attributes. It is America's largest and oldest pet cemetery.

It was listed on the National Register of Historic Places in 2012.

== History ==
In 1896, Dr. Samuel Johnson, a veterinarian in New York City, offered his apple orchard in Hartsdale as the gravesite for a grieving client, whose dog had died, as animal burials were not permitted in the city. After recounting the story to a friend who was a journalist over lunch, a news article was published in 1898 and later was picked up by The New York Times on September 3, 1905. In the wake of the ensuing publicity, Dr. Johnson received hundreds of requests for pet burials and set aside more of his land until the Hartsdale Canine Cemetery was incorporated on May 14, 1914.

The War Dog Memorial was erected in 1923, featuring a bronze statue of a German Shepherd dog, wearing a blanket with a Red Cross Insignia. It commemorates "man's most faithful friend for the valiant services rendered in the World War, 1914–1918" and a ceremony is held annually in June to honor service dogs.

== Notable interments ==
- Ming of Harlem

== Gallery ==
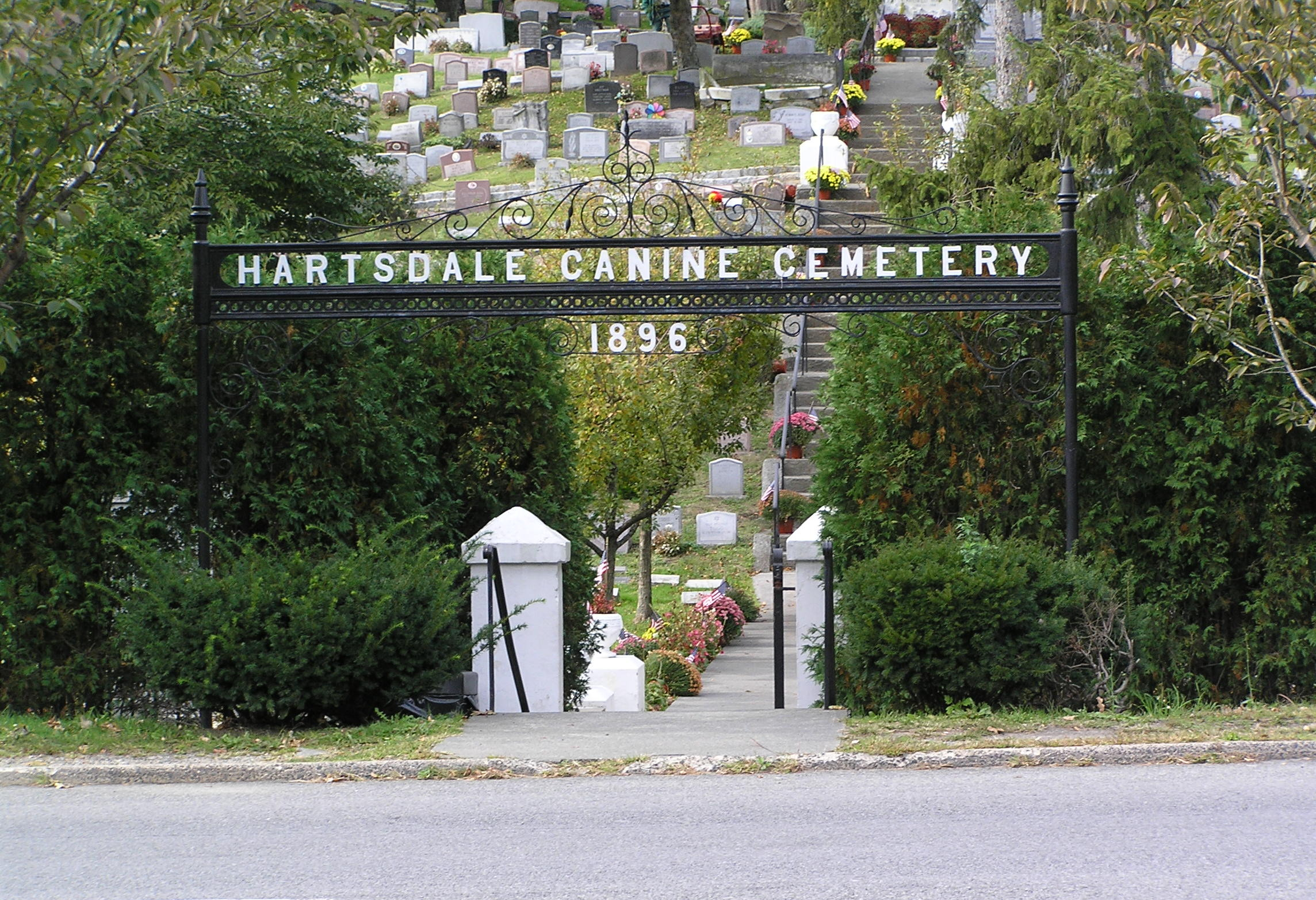
Hartsdale Canine Cemetery, October 2012

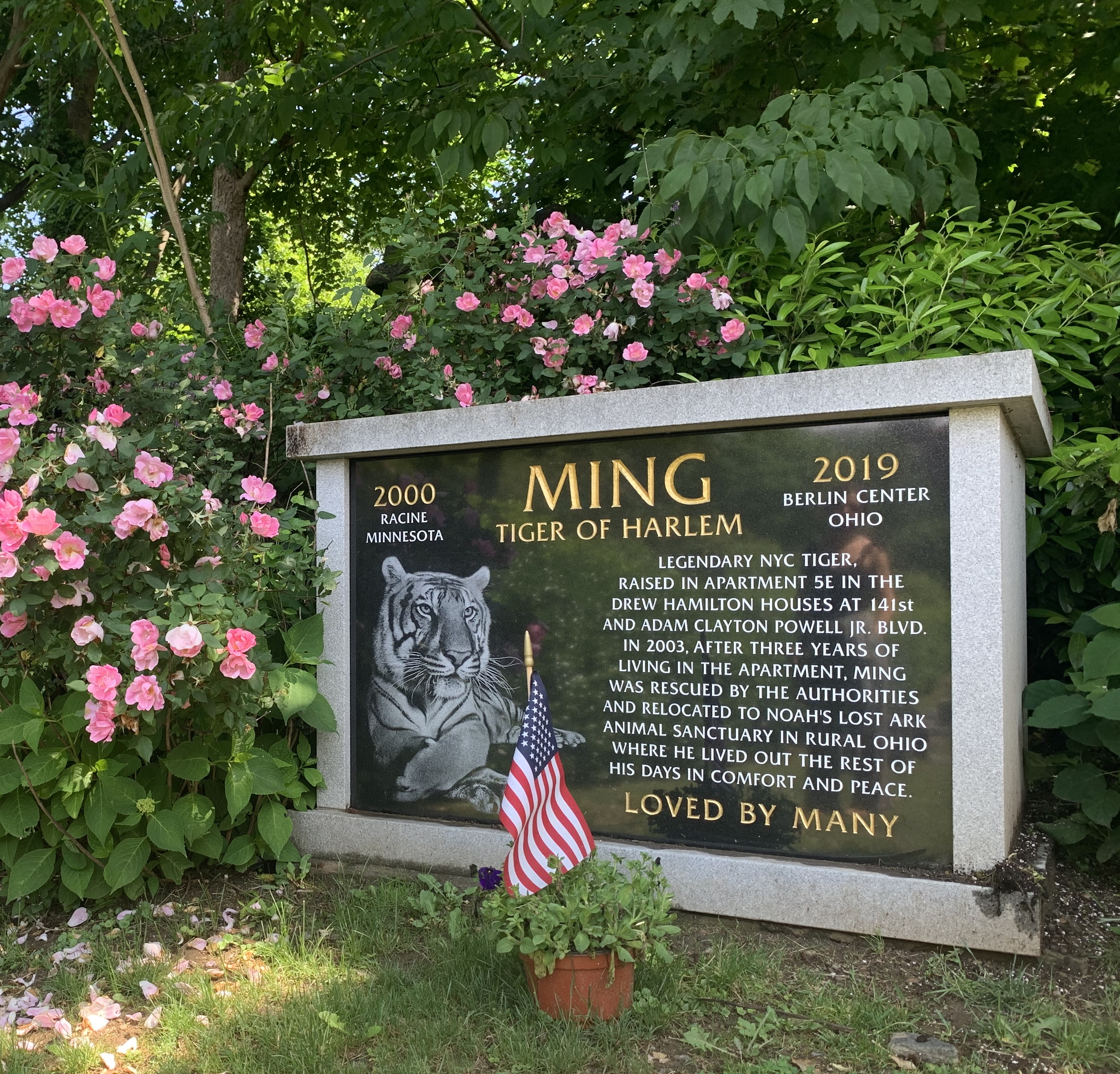
Resting place of Ming

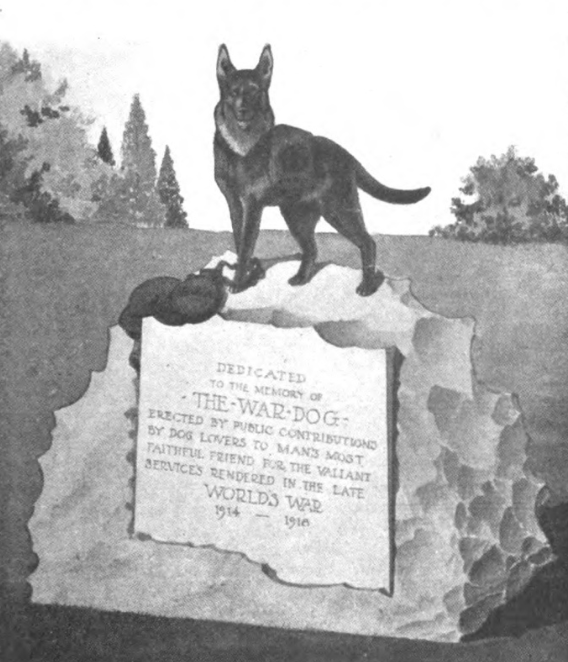
War Dog Memorial
