= Ming of Harlem =

Tiger kept in an apartment in New York City, USA

Ming
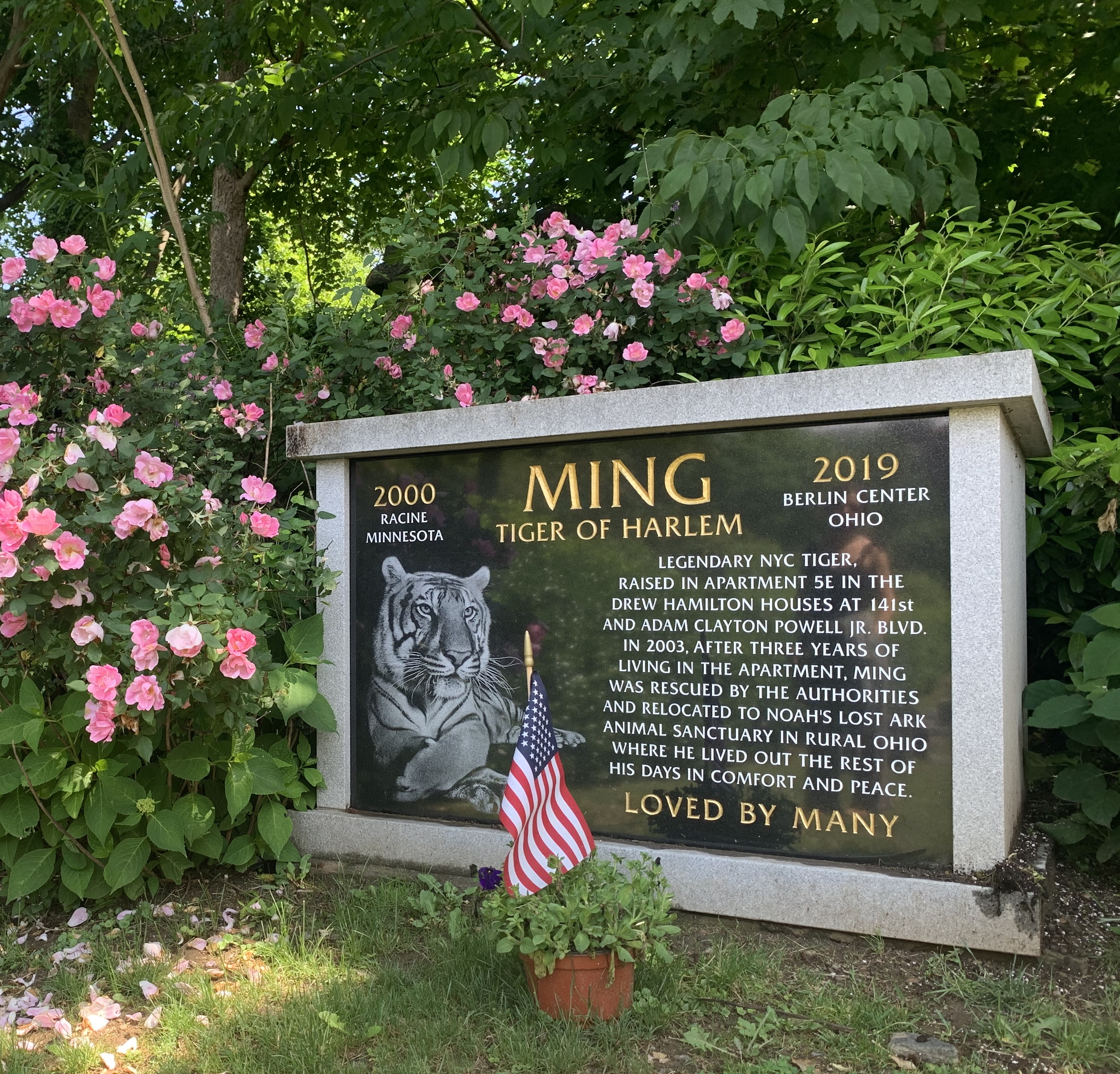
- Ming's resting place in Hartsdale, NY
- Species: Panthera tigris
- Breed: Siberian/Bengal (P. t. altaica/tigris)
- Sex: Male
- Born: February 2000; Racine, Minnesota, United States
- Died: February 4, 2019 (aged about 19); Noah's Lost Ark Animal Sanctuary, Berlin Center, Ohio
- Resting place: Hartsdale Pet Cemetery, Westchester County, New York
- Known for: Residing in an apartment building in Harlem, New York
- Owners: BEARCAT Hollow (2000); Antoine Yates (2000–03); Noah's Lost Ark Animal Sanctuary (2003–2019)
- Weight: 193 kg (425 lb; 30 st 5 lb)

Ming (2000–2019) was a tiger that was found living in an apartment in Harlem, New York City, United States, in October 2003, when he was approximately three years old. Ming lived semi-openly with his owner, Antoine Yates, in a room of Yates' five-bedroom apartment on the fifth floor of a large public housing complex. Several other exotic pets were found in the apartment and seized by police, including an alligator named Al in another bedroom. Yates received a 5-month prison sentence for reckless endangerment.

Ming was taken to Noah's Lost Ark Animal Sanctuary in Berlin Center, Ohio, where he died from natural causes in February 2019. He was buried at the Hartsdale Pet Cemetery in Hartsdale, New York.

== History ==
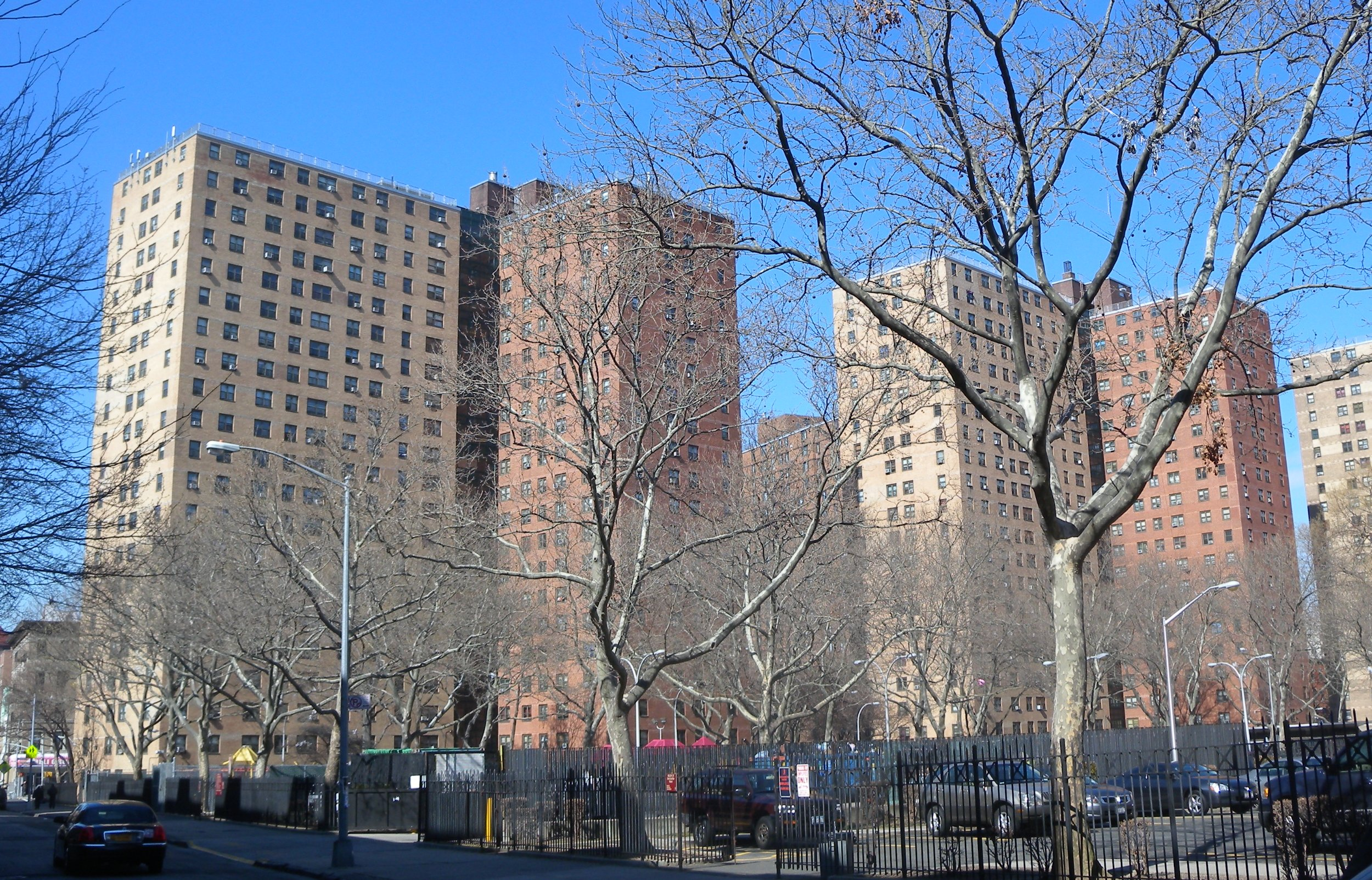
Two of the five buildings in the Drew-Hamilton complex (2012)

In April 2000, Antoine Yates, a 31-year-old part-time taxicab driver and resident of Harlem, New York City, purchased Ming, an 8-week-old male Siberian–Bengal tiger hybrid, from the BEARCAT Hollow Animal Park in Racine, Minnesota. Records indicated that BEARCAT Hollow had previously sold a lion cub to Yates, and he had found another home for the lion shortly after purchasing Ming.

In an interview published in 2020, Yates clarified that he first had purchased Jabba, a lion cub that died at a young age, and then he purchased Ming and Nemo, another lion cub, as a pair. Nemo was included with the sale because he was ill and unlikely to live long. At the time he acquired Ming, Yates already owned an alligator named Al, which he had purchased legally in New Jersey. Yates refused to domesticate his animals, comparing himself to a “drill sergeant” training in their natural instincts.

Yates lived with the animals in Apartment 5E of the Drew-Hamilton Houses, a public housing complex. For five years, Yates left the apartment only once a day for an hour to purchase food.

== Discovery ==
Ming's existence became known and reported in the media after Yates was taken to the Harlem Hospital Center emergency room on September 30, 2003 with bites on the arm and leg. At the time of treatment, Yates claimed that his pet pit bull had bitten him; however, the medical personnel were suspicious, because the width of the bite marks suggested an animal with a much larger jaw. Later, Yates said he had been bitten while trying to keep Ming away from Shadow, a cat he had recently adopted. That day was the first time Ming had met Shadow. According to Yates, after Ming began chasing Shadow, Yates jumped in front of Ming, who bit and clawed Yates multiple times as he wrestled with the tiger. After Ming finally closed his jaws on Yates's knee, Yates recalled "That had me going through flashes of life. I was like, 'Oh my god, guess this is where I die at.'" Yates declined to call it an attack, saying it was a natural reaction of Ming's frustration: "I'm walking around. I'm still alive. I haven't lost a limb. You couldn't even tell I got bit by a tiger, unless I told you and showed you the mark."

On Thursday, October 2, the police received an anonymous tip that "there was a large wild animal that was biting people"; the same anonymous person followed up the next day by providing the animal's location at Yates's apartment. Yates checked out of the hospital that same day, and following up on the tips, an officer of New York City Police Department was sent to his home address to investigate on October 3. Loud growling noises could be heard through the door of the apartment and the officer declined to enter. The NYPD Technical Assistance Response Unit drilled holes through a neighbor's walls and used a camera on a pole to locate Ming. Martin Duffy, another police officer, was sent to the roof, from which he abseiled on a rope sling to look through the apartment's windows. Ming roared at Duffy, who then anaesthetized Ming by firing a rifle with a tranquilizer dart prepared by Dr. Robert Cook, the then Chief Veterinarian of the Wildlife Conservation Society, which manages the city's zoos.

After being shot, Ming charged at the window from which Duffy had fired, breaking it, then retreated into the apartment. Authorities waited several minutes for the sedative to take effect before an animal control team was sent into Yates' apartment. Dr. Cook used a catchpole and gave Ming another sedative injection to ensure he would remain asleep during transport. It took more than six men to carry Ming down via elevator to a waiting truck. The team also discovered Al, a 1.7 m (5.5 ft) alligator, that Yates had been raising in one of the other bedrooms. Yates was later located at a hospital in Philadelphia and placed under guard.

After Ming was discovered in Yates' apartment, questioning of the neighbors determined that the existence of the tiger had been widely known for at least three years, but as a sort of urban legend. Yates regularly bought large quantities of raw chicken at the local supermarket, and one standing joke in the building was that he could eat so much chicken every day. By 2003, Yates was feeding Ming 9 kg (20 lb) of chicken, livers, and bones per day. The downstairs neighbor was aware that Yates owned many animals, in contradiction to Housing Authority rules, and her daughter had once seen Ming. The neighbor added it was not a problem until the summer of 2003, when she opened her windows for the first time that year and found her windowsills soaked with urine accompanied by a heavy animal odor. In addition, Yates had had roommates, who were unaware at first of the animals in the home. According to the New York Daily News:

A woman who shared a Harlem apartment with a 193 kg (425 lb) tiger said yesterday she was terrified at first—but soon got used to living with the man-eater down the hall. Caroline Domingo told the Daily News she couldn't believe her eyes when she spotted the big cat roaming free in the apartment where she and her husband rented a room from tiger-owner Antoine Yates. [...] But eventually, she said, "We all became family."

== Aftermath ==
=== Legal actions ===
Yates was arrested on charges of reckless endangerment and the possession of a wild animal. Later, his mother was charged with endangering the welfare of a child, since she had been babysitting children in the apartment. As part of a plea agreement to reduce charges against his mother, Yates pleaded guilty to reckless endangerment, and eventually served a five-month prison term with five years' probation. He was released after serving three months, and subsequently he sued New York City for the loss of his pets (including a rabbit) and for US$7,000 cash, which he claimed had also been in the apartment. A judge dismissed the case, calling him full of "chutzpah". According to Yates, the suit was dismissed because it would have revealed the New York City Housing Authority had not been conducting required quarterly inspections of the apartment, as records had stated.

=== Animal rescue ===
Authorities decided to move the seized animals to more appropriate housing: Ming was sent to Noah's Lost Ark Animal Sanctuary in Berlin Center, Ohio, while Al was given a new home in Indiana. For approximately a decade, human visitors were barred from visiting Ming in Ohio, but the sanctuary later changed their policy in the interest of enrichment. Ming lived in Ohio until he died on February 4, 2019, of kidney and heart failure. His remains were cremated and interred at Hartsdale Pet Cemetery in Hartsdale, New York on April 20. The cemetery donated the site and mausoleum. According to the director of Noah's Lost Ark, "[Ming] lived a really good life here. He was able to run and play on the grounds. He had tiger friends. He had a swimming pool. He was able to experience the elements."

=== Yates' life after the incident ===
Around 2010, Yates stated he lived in Pahrump, Nevada near Las Vegas with 22 big cats, including four tigers, having redubbed himself "Antoine Tigermann Yates". He established the Reach Out And Respond (ROAR) Foundation in 2011. A 2018 article in the New York Post cast doubt on Yates's veracity, noting that a licensed tiger owner in Pahrump stated that Yates had never lived in Nevada. A 2020 interview with Yates stated that he was living in Philadelphia with his mother and "a more humble collection of snakes, lizards, turtles, tortoises and chinchillas". He was dismissive of the people documented in the Netflix mini-series Tiger King, calling them "ignorant ... so-called exotic animal lovers."

== In media ==
In October 2010, the story of Yates and Ming was dramatized on the Animal Planet show Fatal Attractions. The episode was titled "A Tiger Loose in Harlem". A mix of re-creation and documented footage was used, complete with commentary by Yates, his family and police.

Ming is mentioned in the documentary film, The Tiger Next Door.

Ming of Harlem: Twenty-One Storeys in the Air was screened at the New York Film Festival on October 3, 2014.

A photo of Ming was used by New York City rap group Armand Hammer for the cover of their 2020 album Shrines.
