= Rost =

Rost, Røst, or Röst may refer to:

== Places ==
=== Germany ===
- Tensbüttel-Röst, municipality in the district of Dithmarschen, in Schleswig-Holstein, Germany

=== Norway ===
- Røst Municipality, an island municipality in Nordland county, Norway
- Røstlandet (also known as Røst), an island within Røst Municipality in Nordland county, Norway
- Røstlandet (village) (also known as Røst), a village in Røst Municipality in Nordland county, Norway
- Røst Airport, an airport in Røst Municipality in Nordland county, Norway
- Røst Church, a church in Røst Municipality in Nordland county, Norway
- Røst Reef, a deep-water coral reef off the coast of the Lofoten islands in Nordland county, Norway

=== United States ===
- Rost Township, Jackson County, Minnesota, township in Jackson County, Minnesota, United States
- Rost, Minnesota, unincorporated community, United States

== People ==
- Andrea Rost (born 1962), a Hungarian lyric soprano
- Burkhard Rost (born 1961), a German scientist - computational biologists
- Christina Rost (born 1952), a German former women's team handball player
- Clarence Rost (1914–2008), a former Canadian professional ice hockey player
- Erik Rost (born 1985), a Swedish ski-orienteering competitor
- Frank Rost (born 1973), a German footballer who plays as a goalkeeper
- Jan Rost, a German physicist
- Johann Leonhard Rost (1688–1727), a German astronomer and author from Nuremberg
- John Rost (born 1944), a former British ice hockey player
- Jürgen Rost, a classical guitarist and professor of guitar
- Karl Rost (1880–1919), a German entomologist and insect dealer
- Marinus Bernardus Rost van Tonningen (1852–1927), a Dutch Major General
- Markus Rost, a German mathematician who works at the intersection of topology and algebra
- Meinoud Rost van Tonningen (1894–1945), a Dutch politician of the National Socialist Movement
- Monika Rost (born 1943), a classical guitarist, lutenist and professor
- Peter Rost (doctor), M.D. (born 1959), a former vice president at the pharmaceutical company Pfizer
- Peter Rost (handballer) (born 1951), a former German Team handball player
- Peter Rost (UK politician) (1930–2022), a retired British Conservative politician and Member of Parliament
- Pierre Adolphe Rost (1797–1868), a Louisiana politician, diplomat, lawyer, judge, and plantation owner
- Randi J. Rost (born 1960), a computer graphics professional and frequent contributor to graphics standards
- Timo Rost (born 1978), a German footballer who currently plays for RB Leipzig
- Yuri Rost (born 1939), a Ukrainian photographer, journalist, author and traveller

== Other ==
- Rost (crater), lunar impact crater that is located in the southwestern part of the Moon, to the southeast of the elongated formation Schiller
- I din röst (In your voice), an album by the Swedish singer Charlotte Perrelli
- ROST (NASDAQ), the trade name for Ross Dress for Less Company which is traded on Nasdaq
- Rost (Tashkent newspaper), a Bukharian-Jewish (Judeo-Tajik) language wall newspaper-bulletin published twice weekly from Tashkent, Turkestan
- Rost invariant, a cohomological invariant in mathematics
