= Heron Lake Township, Jackson County, Minnesota =

Heron Lake Township, Minnesota
- Township
- Location within the state of Minnesota Heron Lake Township, Minnesota (the United States)
- Coordinates: 43°42′56″N 95°11′12″W
- Country: United States
- State: Minnesota
- County: Jackson

Area
  - Total: 43.9 sq mi (113.7 km^{2})
  - Land: 38.8 sq mi (100.4 km^{2})
  - Water: 5.1 sq mi (13.3 km^{2})
- Elevation: 1,499 ft (457 m)

Population (2000)
  - Total: 401
  - Density: 10/sq mi (4/km^{2})
- Time zone: UTC-6 (Central (CST))
  - Summer (DST): UTC-5 (CDT)
- ZIP code: 56137
- Area code: 507
- FIPS code: 27-28718
- GNIS feature ID: 0664462

Heron Lake Township is a township in Jackson County, Minnesota, United States. The population was 401 at the 2000 census.

Heron Lake Township was organized in 1870, and named for Heron Lake.

== Geography ==
According to the United States Census Bureau, the township has a total area of 43.9 square miles (114 km^{2}), of which 38.8 square miles (100 km^{2}) is land and 5.1 square miles (13 km^{2}) (11.71%) is water.

== Demographics ==
As of the census of 2000, there were 401 people, 146 households, and 110 families residing in the township. The population density was 10.3 inhabitants per square mile (4.0/km^{2}). There were 152 housing units at an average density of 3.9 per square mile (1.5/km^{2}). The racial makeup of the township was 99.50% White, 0.25% Asian, 0.25% from other races. Hispanic or Latino of any race were 1.25% of the population.

There were 146 households, out of which 32.9% had children under the age of 18 living with them, 69.9% were married couples living together, 2.7% had a female householder with no husband present, and 24.0% were non-families. 21.2% of all households were made up of individuals, and 7.5% had someone living alone who was 65 years of age or older. The average household size was 2.75 and the average family size was 3.22.

In the township the population was spread out, with 27.7% under the age of 18, 7.0% from 18 to 24, 29.2% from 25 to 44, 21.7% from 45 to 64, and 14.5% who were 65 years of age or older. The median age was 38 years. For every 100 females, there were 119.1 males. For every 100 females age 18 and over, there were 121.4 males.

The median income for a household in the township was $40,714, and the median income for a family was $43,194. Males had a median income of $22,188 versus $23,125 for females. The per capita income for the township was $14,380. About 6.3% of families and 9.8% of the population were below the poverty line, including 10.9% of those under age 18 and none of those age 65 or over.

== Politics ==
Heron Lake Township is located in Minnesota's 1st congressional district, represented by New Ulm farmer Brad Finstad, a Republican. At the state level, Heron Lake Township is located in Senate District 22, represented by Republican Doug Magnus, and in House District 22B, represented by Republican Rod Hamilton.
