= Minnesota State Highway 86 =

State highway in Minnesota, United States

Trunk Highway 86
- MN 86 highlighted in red

Route information
- Maintained by MnDOT
- Length: 22.850 mi (36.774 km)
- Existed: 1933–present

Major junctions
- South end: Iowa 86 at Minnesota - Iowa state line at Minneota Township
- I-90 near Lakefield
- North end: MN 60 near Wilder

Location
- Country: United States
- State: Minnesota
- Counties: Jackson

Highway system
- Minnesota Trunk Highway System; Interstate; US; State; Legislative; Scenic
← MN 84	→ MN 87

Minnesota State Highway 86 (MN 86) is a highway in southwest Minnesota, which runs from Iowa Highway 86 at the Iowa state line, near Spirit Lake, IA, and continues north to its northern terminus at its intersection with State Highway 60 near Windom and Wilder.

== Route description ==
Highway 86 serves as a 23-mile (37 km) north–south route between Windom, Lakefield, and the Iowa state line.

The route has an interchange with Interstate 90 near Lakefield.

Kilen Woods State Park, on the banks of the Des Moines River, is 5 miles east of the junction of Highway 86 and County Road 24. The park entrance is located on County Road 24.

== History ==
Highway 86 was authorized in 1933.

In 1934, the highway was paved between U.S. Highway 16 and Lakefield.

The route was still gravel south of U.S. 16 in 1942. It was completely paved by 1953.

== Major intersections ==
The entire route is in Jackson County.

Location	mi	km	Destinations	Notes
Minneota Township	0.000	0.000	Iowa 86 south	Continuation into Iowa
Hunter Township	8.120	13.068	CSAH 34	Former U.S. 16
Hunter Township	9.558– 9.714	15.382– 15.633	I-90 – Jackson, Worthington	Interchange
Delafield Township	22.855	36.782	MN 60 – Wilder, Windom	Northern terminus
1.000 mi = 1.609 km; 1.000 km = 0.621 mi
