= Lakefield, Minnesota =

City in Minnesota, United States

Lakefield
- City
- Location of Lakefield, Minnesota
- Coordinates: 43°40′41″N 95°10′10″W
- Country: United States
- State: Minnesota
- County: Jackson

Government
  - Type: Mayor – Council
  - Mayor: Stephen Condon

Area
  - Total: 1.34 sq mi (3.47 km^{2})
  - Land: 1.34 sq mi (3.47 km^{2})
  - Water: 0 sq mi (0.00 km^{2})
- Elevation: 1,480 ft (450 m)

Population (2020)
  - Total: 1,735
  - Density: 1,297/sq mi (500.6/km^{2})
- Time zone: UTC-6 (Central (CST))
  - Summer (DST): UTC-5 (CDT)
- ZIP code: 56150
- Area code: 507
- FIPS code: 27-34316
- GNIS feature ID: 2395608
- Website: http://www.lakefieldmn.com/

Lakefield is a city in Jackson County, Minnesota, United States. The population was 1,735 at the 2020 census.

== History ==
Lakefield was laid out in 1879, when the railroad was extended to that point. It was named for its location near Heron Lake. A post office has been in operation at Lakefield since 1880. The city was incorporated in 1887.

== Geography ==
According to the United States Census Bureau, the city has a total area of 1.28 square miles (3.32 km^{2}), all land.

Minnesota State Highway 86 is the main route through the city. Exit 64 of Interstate 90 is about two miles south.

== Demographics ==
Historical population
Census	Pop.	Note	%±
1890	275		—
1900	862		213.5%
1910	924		7.2%
1920	1,346		45.7%
1930	1,349		0.2%
1940	1,699		25.9%
1950	1,651		−2.8%
1960	1,789		8.4%
1970	1,820		1.7%
1980	1,845		1.4%
1990	1,679		−9.0%
2000	1,721		2.5%
2010	1,694		−1.6%
2020	1,735		2.4%
U.S. Decennial Census

=== 2020 census ===
As of the 2020 census, Lakefield had a population of 1,735. The median age was 40.4 years. 23.8% of residents were under the age of 18 and 22.8% of residents were 65 years of age or older. For every 100 females there were 96.5 males, and for every 100 females age 18 and over there were 95.3 males age 18 and over.

0.0% of residents lived in urban areas, while 100.0% lived in rural areas.

There were 748 households in Lakefield, of which 28.2% had children under the age of 18 living in them. Of all households, 43.3% were married-couple households, 21.0% were households with a male householder and no spouse or partner present, and 28.1% were households with a female householder and no spouse or partner present. About 36.0% of all households were made up of individuals and 20.1% had someone living alone who was 65 years of age or older.

There were 831 housing units, of which 10.0% were vacant. The homeowner vacancy rate was 1.8% and the rental vacancy rate was 12.7%.

Racial composition as of the 2020 census
Race	Number	Percent
White	1,612	92.9%
Black or African American	15	0.9%
American Indian and Alaska Native	6	0.3%
Asian	7	0.4%
Native Hawaiian and Other Pacific Islander	0	0.0%
Some other race	10	0.6%
Two or more races	85	4.9%
Hispanic or Latino (of any race)	51	2.9%

=== 2010 census ===
As of the census of 2010, there were 1,694 people, 762 households, and 462 families living in the city. The population density was 1,323.4 inhabitants per square mile (511.0/km^{2}). There were 838 housing units at an average density of 654.7 per square mile (252.8/km^{2}). The racial makeup of the city was 98.0% White, 0.8% African American, 0.1% Asian, 0.7% from other races, and 0.4% from two or more races. Hispanic or Latino of any race were 2.2% of the population.

There were 762 households, of which 27.4% had children under the age of 18 living with them, 46.5% were married couples living together, 10.2% had a female householder with no husband present, 3.9% had a male householder with no wife present, and 39.4% were non-families. 35.8% of all households were made up of individuals, and 19.9% had someone living alone who was 65 years of age or older. The average household size was 2.18 and the average family size was 2.80.

The median age in the city was 41.4 years. 22.4% of residents were under the age of 18; 7.6% were between the ages of 18 and 24; 23.7% were from 25 to 44; 24.3% were from 45 to 64; and 22.1% were 65 years of age or older. The gender makeup of the city was 46.4% male and 53.6% female.

=== 2000 census ===
As of the census of 2000, there were 1,721 people, 731 households, and 453 families living in the city. The population density was 1,611.0 inhabitants per square mile (622.0/km^{2}). There were 784 housing units at an average density of 733.9 per square mile (283.4/km^{2}). The racial makeup of the city was 99.07% White, 0.23% Native American, 0.17% Asian, 0.41% from other races, and 0.12% from two or more races. Hispanic or Latino of any race were 0.93% of the population.

There were 731 households, out of which 28.0% had children under the age of 18 living with them, 53.4% were married couples living together, 6.4% had a female householder with no husband present, and 37.9% were non-families. 34.1% of all households were made up of individuals, and 20.8% had someone living alone who was 65 years of age or older. The average household size was 2.24 and the average family size was 2.88.

In the city, the population was spread out, with 23.0% under the age of 18, 6.0% from 18 to 24, 23.8% from 25 to 44, 21.4% from 45 to 64, and 25.8% who were 65 years of age or older. The median age was 43 years. For every 100 females, there were 88.5 males. For every 100 females age 18 and over, there were 81.5 males.

The median income for a household in the city was $31,250, and the median income for a family was $37,898. Males had a median income of $26,875 versus $19,932 for females. The per capita income for the city was $16,003.

== Politics ==
Lakefield is located in Minnesota's 1st congressional district, represented by Republican Jim Hagedorn. At the state level, Lakefield is located in Senate District 22, represented by Republican Bill Weber (politician), and in House District 22B, represented by Republican Rod Hamilton.
