= West Heron Lake Township, Jackson County, Minnesota =

West Heron Lake Township, Minnesota
- Township
- Location within the state of Minnesota West Heron Lake Township, Minnesota (the United States)
- Coordinates: 43°43′37″N 95°17′3″W
- Country: United States
- State: Minnesota
- County: Jackson

Area
  - Total: 27.5 sq mi (71.2 km^{2})
  - Land: 27.4 sq mi (70.9 km^{2})
  - Water: 0.12 sq mi (0.3 km^{2})
- Elevation: 1,424 ft (434 m)

Population (2000)
  - Total: 202
  - Density: 7.3/sq mi (2.8/km^{2})
- Time zone: UTC-6 (Central (CST))
  - Summer (DST): UTC-5 (CDT)
- FIPS code: 27-69484
- GNIS feature ID: 0665965

West Heron Lake Township is a township in Jackson County, Minnesota, United States. The population was 202 at the 2000 census.

West Heron Lake Township was organized in 1874, and named for its location west of Heron Lake.

== Geography ==
According to the United States Census Bureau, the township has a total area of 27.5 square miles (71.2 km^{2}), of which 27.4 square miles (70.9 km^{2}) is land and 0.1 square mile (0.3 km^{2}) (0.40%) is water.

== Demographics ==
As of the census of 2000, there were 202 people, 69 households, and 60 families residing in the township. The population density was 7.4 people per square mile (2.8/km^{2}). There were 75 housing units at an average density of 2.7/sq mi (1.1/km^{2}). The racial makeup of the township was 98.51% White, 1.49% from other races. Hispanic or Latino of any race were 1.98% of the population.

There were 69 households, out of which 43.5% had children under the age of 18 living with them, 84.1% were married couples living together, 1.4% had a female householder with no husband present, and 13.0% were non-families. 13.0% of all households were made up of individuals, and 8.7% had someone living alone who was 65 years of age or older. The average household size was 2.93 and the average family size was 3.20.

In the township the population was spread out, with 30.7% under the age of 18, 5.0% from 18 to 24, 26.7% from 25 to 44, 26.2% from 45 to 64, and 11.4% who were 65 years of age or older. The median age was 37 years. For every 100 females, there were 87.0 males. For every 100 females age 18 and over, there were 100.0 males.

The median income for a household in the township was $41,250, and the median income for a family was $49,375. Males had a median income of $27,250 versus $25,208 for females. The per capita income for the township was $14,897. None of the population or families were below the poverty line.

== Politics ==
West Heron Lake Township is located in Minnesota's 1st congressional district, represented by Mankato educator Tim Walz, a Democrat. At the state level, West Heron Lake Township is located in Senate District 22, represented by Republican Doug Magnus, and in House District 22B, represented by Republican Rod Hamilton.
