= Bergen, Minnesota =

Unincorporated community in Minnesota, United States

Bergen
- Unincorporated community
- Location within Minnesota Location within the United States
- Coordinates: 43°47′24″N 94°59′41″W
- Country: United States
- State: Minnesota
- County: Jackson
- Township: Christiania
- Elevation: 1,391 ft (424 m)
- Time zone: UTC-6 (Central (CST))
  - Summer (DST): UTC-5 (CDT)
- GNIS feature ID: 639958

Bergen is an unincorporated community in Christiania Township, Jackson County, Minnesota, United States.

Bergen is located in Minnesota's 1st congressional district, represented by Republican Brad Finstad. At the state level, Jackson is located in Senate District 21, represented by Republican Bill Weber, and in House District 22B, represented by Republican Rod Hamilton.

Bergen at one time had a general store, which closed in the 1970s, a meat locker, which is still open, Bergen Meats, a feed and seed (closed in the 1970s), a bar which is now a nice little steak house, a gas station which closed in the late 1960s and there was a one-room schoolhouse (later Christiana Town Hall) just down the road, which was just recently torn down. There are still about half a dozen houses or so there.
