= Round Lake Township, Minnesota =

Round Lake Township is the name of some places in the U.S. state of Minnesota:

- Round Lake Township, Becker County, Minnesota
- Round Lake Township, Jackson County, Minnesota

== See also ==
- Round Lake Township (disambiguation)
