= Enterprise Township, Jackson County, Minnesota =

Enterprise Township, Minnesota
- Township
- Location within the state of Minnesota Enterprise Township, Minnesota (the United States)
- Coordinates: 43°43′12″N 94°55′30″W
- Country: United States
- State: Minnesota
- County: Jackson

Area
  - Total: 36.0 sq mi (93.3 km^{2})
  - Land: 36.0 sq mi (93.2 km^{2})
  - Water: 0.039 sq mi (0.1 km^{2})
- Elevation: 1,371 ft (418 m)

Population (2000)
  - Total: 204
  - Density: 5.7/sq mi (2.2/km^{2})
- Time zone: UTC-6 (Central (CST))
  - Summer (DST): UTC-5 (CDT)
- FIPS code: 27-19484
- GNIS feature ID: 0664101

Enterprise Township is a township in Jackson County, Minnesota, United States. The population was 204 at the 2000 census.

Enterprise Township was organized in 1871.

== Geography ==
According to the United States Census Bureau, the township has a total area of 36.0 square miles (93 km^{2}), of which 36.0 square miles (93 km^{2}) is land and 0.1 square miles (0.26 km^{2}) (0.14%) is water.

== Demographics ==
As of the census of 2000, there were 204 people, 84 households, and 64 families residing in the township. The population density was 5.7 inhabitants per square mile (2.2/km^{2}). There were 94 housing units at an average density of 2.6 per square mile (1.0/km^{2}). The racial makeup of the township was 100.00% White.

There were 84 households, out of which 32.1% had children under the age of 18 living with them, 63.1% were married couples living together, 6.0% had a female householder with no husband present, and 23.8% were non-families. 21.4% of all households were made up of individuals, and 8.3% had someone living alone who was 65 years of age or older. The average household size was 2.43 and the average family size was 2.78.

In the township the population was spread out, with 25.5% under the age of 18, 4.9% from 18 to 24, 27.5% from 25 to 44, 18.6% from 45 to 64, and 23.5% who were 65 years of age or older. The median age was 41 years. For every 100 females, there were 114.7 males. For every 100 females age 18 and over, there were 120.3 males.

The median income for a household in the township was $42,917, and the median income for a family was $45,750. Males had a median income of $30,938 versus $19,375 for females. The per capita income for the township was $19,946. None of the families and 2.1% of the population were living below the poverty line, including no under eighteens and 4.0% of those over 64.

== Politics ==
Enterprise Township is located in Minnesota's 1st congressional district, represented by Mankato educator Tim Walz, a Democrat. At the state level, Enterprise Township is located in Senate District 22, represented by Republican Doug Magnus, and in House District 22B, represented by Republican Rod Hamilton.
