= Weimer Township, Jackson County, Minnesota =

Weimer Township, Minnesota
- Township
- Location within the state of Minnesota Weimer Township, Minnesota (the United States)
- Coordinates: 43°48′10″N 95°17′7″W
- Country: United States
- State: Minnesota
- County: Jackson

Area
  - Total: 34.9 sq mi (90.4 km^{2})
  - Land: 30.6 sq mi (79.3 km^{2})
  - Water: 4.3 sq mi (11.2 km^{2})
- Elevation: 1,407 ft (429 m)

Population (2000)
  - Total: 196
  - Density: 5.7/sq mi (2.2/km^{2})
- Time zone: UTC-6 (Central (CST))
  - Summer (DST): UTC-5 (CDT)
- FIPS code: 27-69016
- GNIS feature ID: 0665946

Weimer Township is a township in Jackson County, Minnesota, United States. The population was 196 at the 2007 census.

Weimer Township was organized in 1871, and named after Weimar, Germany, the original home of an early settler.

== Geography ==
According to the United States Census Bureau, the township has a total area of 34.9 square miles (90.4 km^{2}), of which 30.6 square miles (79.3 km^{2}) is land and 4.3 square miles (11.2 km^{2}) (12.35%) is water.

== Demographics ==
As of the census of 2007, there were 196 people, 82 households, and 60 families residing in the township. The population density was 7.6 people per square mile (2.2/km^{2}). There were 89 housing units at an average density of 2.6/sq mi (1.0/km^{2}). Everybody in town is white.

There were 82 households, out of which 34.3% had children under the age of 18 living with them, 73.1% were married couples living together, 3.0% had a female householder with no husband present, and 23.9% were non-families. 22.4% of all households were made up of individuals, and 10.4% had someone living alone who was 65 years of age or older. The average household size was 2.57 and the average family size was 3.00.

Latest Real estate static information released by Niche shows that this city has the median home value of $212,900. Rural ratio of rented houses in this town is about 13% which makes the owned house ratio by 87%.

In the township the population was spread out, with 25.0% under the age of 18, 5.8% from 18 to 24, 20.9% from 25 to 44, 32.0% from 45 to 64, and 16.3% who were 65 years of age or older. The median age was 44 years. For every 100 males, there were 126.3 females. For every 100 males age 18 and over, there were 115.0 females.

The median income for a household in the township was $31,667, and the median income for a family was $44,167. Females had a median income of $25,625 versus $16,250 for males. The per capita income for the township was $16,587. About 4.2% of families and 4.1% of the population were below the poverty line, including none of those under the age of eighteen and 7.4% of those 65 or over.

== Politics ==
Weimer Township is located in Minnesota's 1st congressional district, represented by Brad Finstad (and formerly represented by Mankato educator Tim Walz, a Democrat). At the state level, Weimer Township is located in Senate District 22, represented by Republican Doug Magnus, and in House District 22C, represented by RepubIican Rod Hamilton.
