= Wilder, Minnesota =

City in Minnesota, United States

Wilder
- City
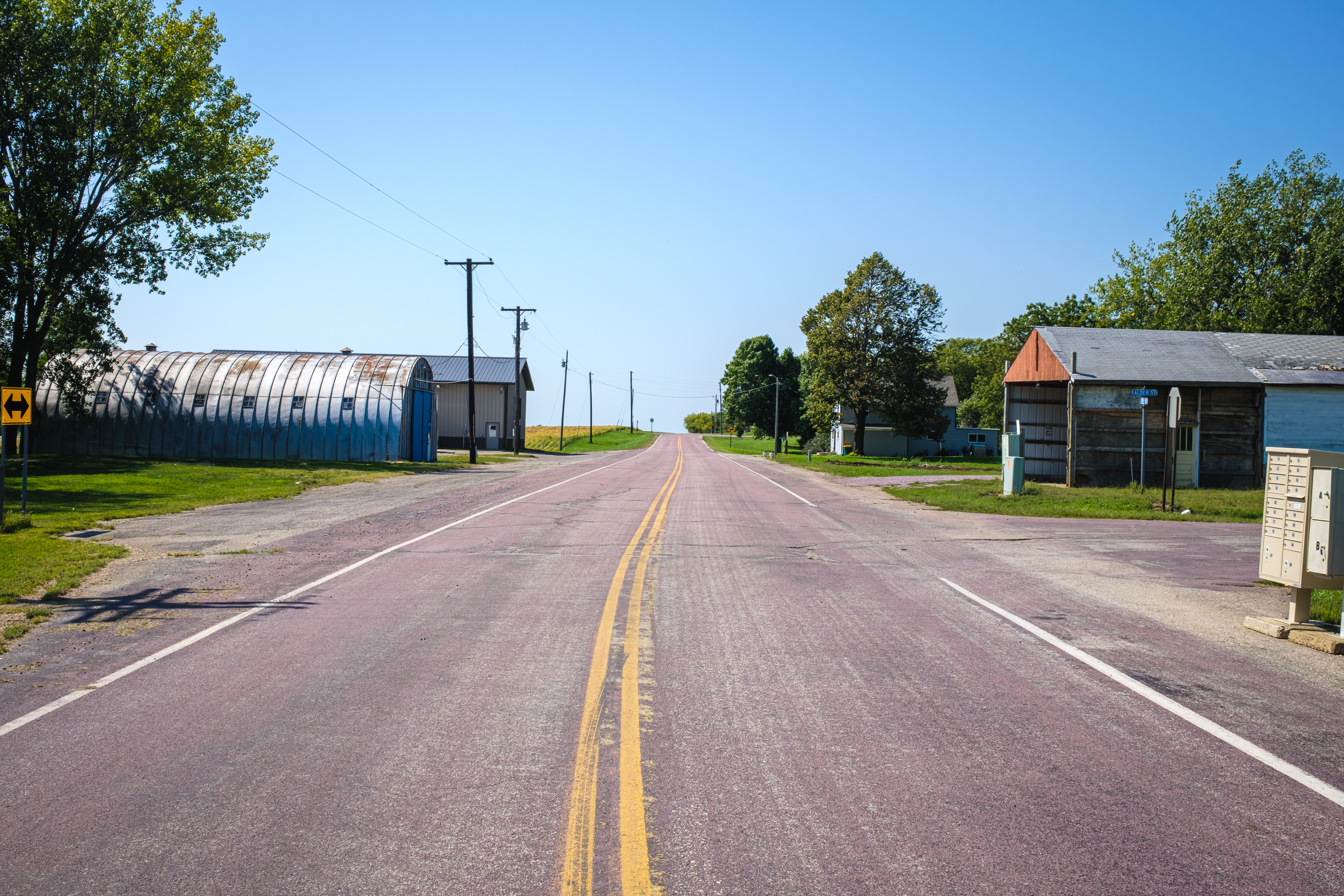

- Location of Wilder, Minnesota
- Coordinates: 43°49′41″N 95°12′21″W
- Country: United States
- State: Minnesota
- County: Jackson

Government
  - Type: Mayor – Council
  - Mayor: Kenny Hunter, Jr.

Area
  - Total: 0.79 sq mi (2.04 km^{2})
  - Land: 0.79 sq mi (2.04 km^{2})
  - Water: 0 sq mi (0.00 km^{2})
- Elevation: 1,453 ft (443 m)

Population (2020)
  - Total: 62
  - Density: 78.6/sq mi (30.34/km^{2})
- Time zone: UTC-6 (Central (CST))
  - Summer (DST): UTC-5 (CDT)
- FIPS code: 27-70258
- GNIS feature ID: 2397310

Wilder is a city in Jackson County, Minnesota, United States. The population was 62 at the 2020 census.

== History ==
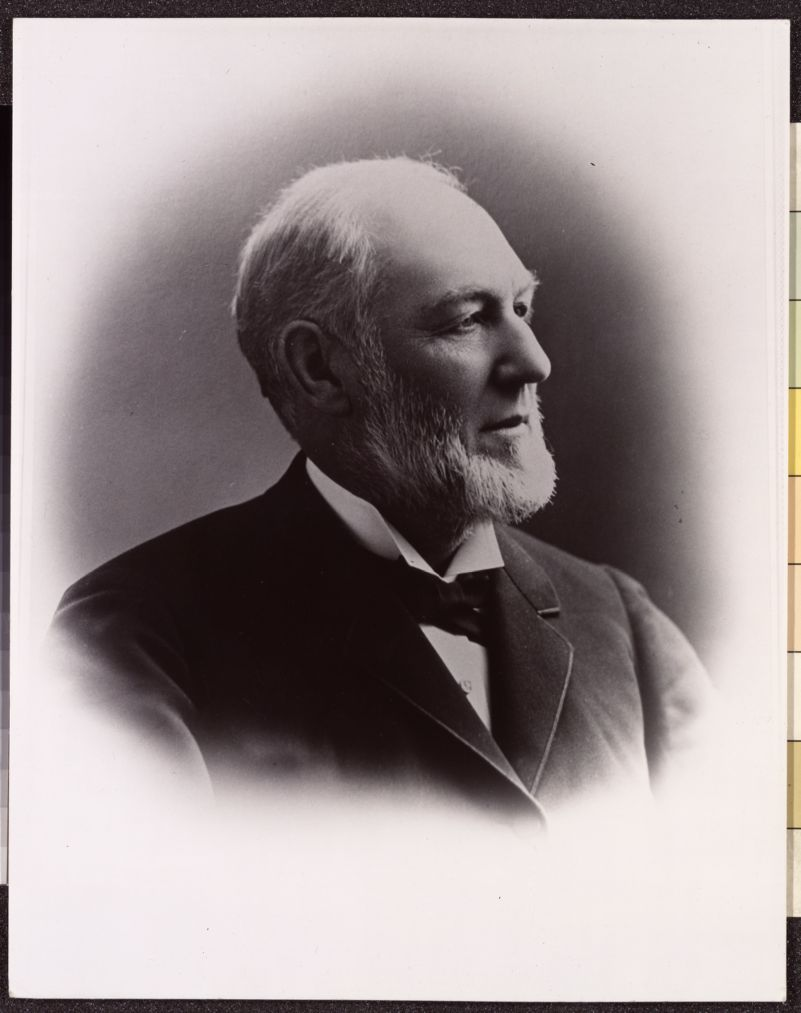
Amherst H. Wilder, namesake of Wilder, Minnesota

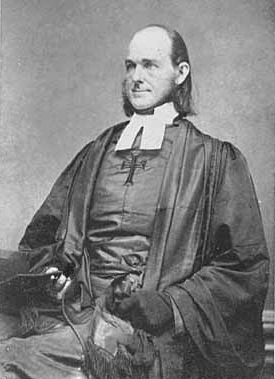
The Reverend James Lloyd Breck, namesake of The Breck School

Wilder was founded in 1885. It was named for Amherst Holcomb Wilder, a railroad official. Wilder was incorporated as a city in 1899. A post office was established in Wilder in 1886, and remained in operation until it was discontinued in 1991.

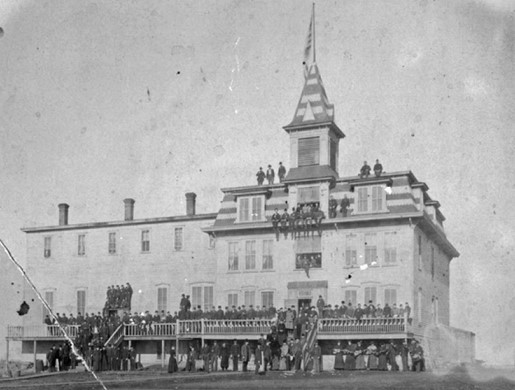
Wilder Campus of the Breck School, 1902

The Breck School was established in Wilder in 1886. It was the first of many Breck campuses subsequently built throughout Minnesota. The school was named after the Reverend James Lloyd Breck, known as "The Apostle of the Wilderness" for his work in establishing mission schools for indigenous peoples in Wisconsin and Minnesota. The Wilder Campus was built to serve children of local farmers whose one-room school education left them unprepared to attend regular high schools. Room, board, and tuition for a year cost $110. Classes began in late September and ended in March. This allowed farm students to return home to assist with spring planting duties. Classes included penmanship, grammar, and arithmetic, but also included such advanced topics as Greek, rhetoric, chemistry, and physics. The Breck School in Wilder closed in 1909, and was reestablished in St Paul in 1916. Breck’s campus today is in Golden Valley, Minnesota.

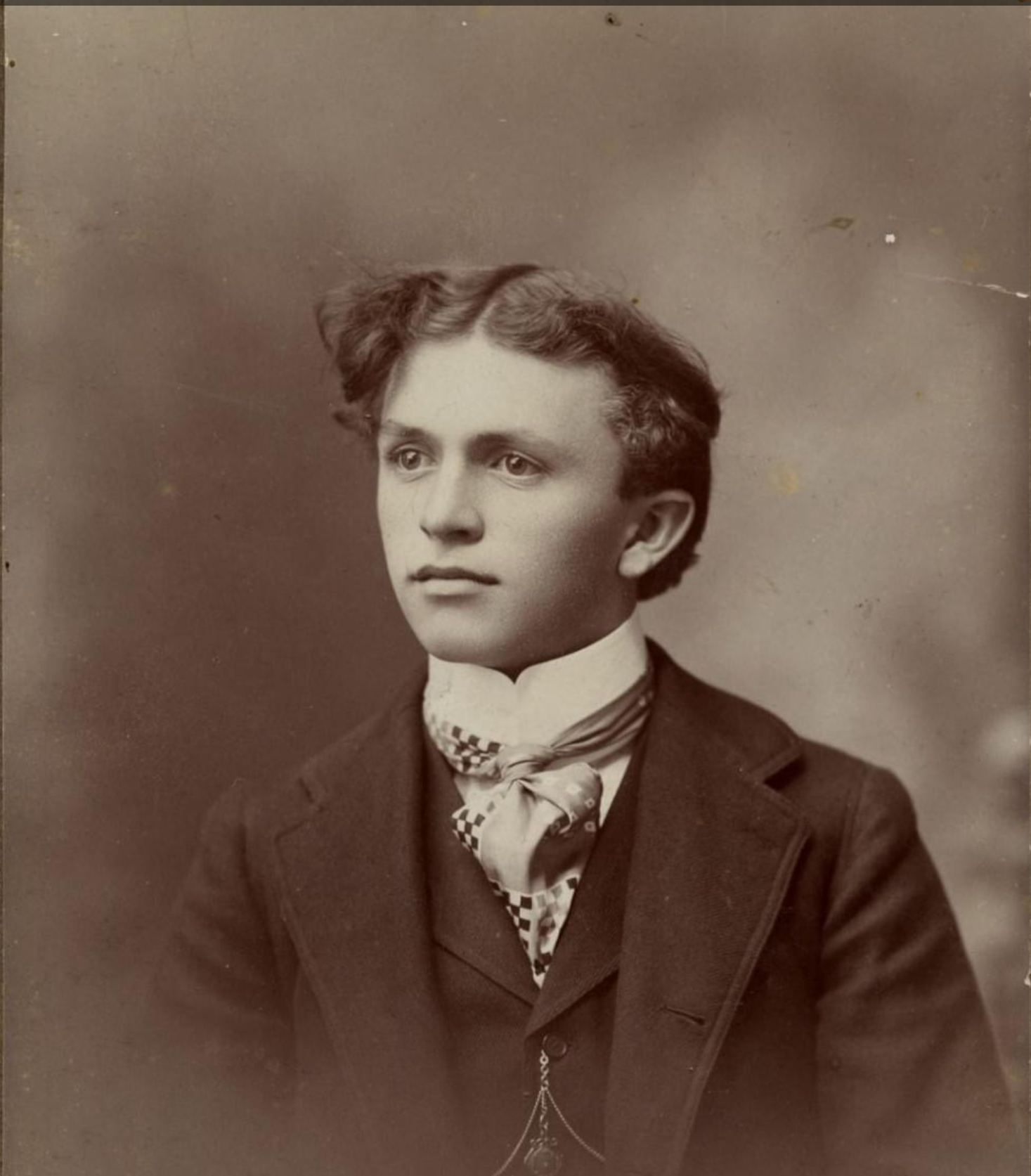
Franklin Clarence Mars while attending the Breck School in Wilder, MM 1889-1900

Franklin Clarence Mars known as Frank, attended the Breck School in Wilder, MN from 1899 to 1900. Mars later gained fame as the founder of the Mars Candy Company. In 1988, the Mars family was ranked as the richest family in the United States of America by Fortune magazine. It has since been surpassed by the Walton family and the Koch family, and was ranked as the third richest family in America in 2016.

== Geography ==
According to the United States Census Bureau, the city has a total area of 0.81 square miles (2.10 km^{2}), of which 0.80 square miles (2.07 km^{2}) is land and 0.01 square miles (0.03 km^{2}) is water.

Minnesota State Highways 60 and 86 are two of the main routes in the community.

== Demographics ==
Historical population
Census	Pop.	Note	%±
1900	174		—
1910	95		−45.4%
1920	91		−4.2%
1930	97		6.6%
1940	127		30.9%
1950	118		−7.1%
1960	107		−9.3%
1970	132		23.4%
1980	120		−9.1%
1990	83		−30.8%
2000	69		−16.9%
2010	60		−13.0%
2020	62		3.3%
U.S. Decennial Census

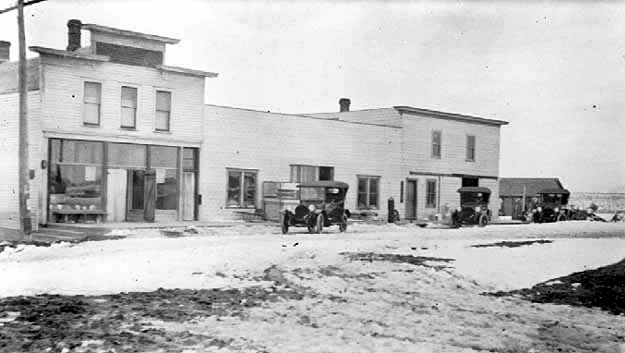
Main Street, c. 1910

=== 2010 census ===
As of the census of 2010, there were 60 people, 25 households, and 16 families residing in the city. The population density was 75.0 inhabitants per square mile (29.0/km^{2}). There were 28 housing units at an average density of 35.0 per square mile (13.5/km^{2}). The racial makeup of the city was 100.0% White.

There were 25 households, of which 24.0% had children under the age of 18 living with them, 48.0% were married couples living together, 8.0% had a female householder with no husband present, 8.0% had a male householder with no wife present, and 36.0% were non-families. 32.0% of all households were made up of individuals, and 16% had someone living alone who was 65 years of age or older. The average household size was 2.40 and the average family size was 3.00.

The median age in the city was 38 years. 28.3% of residents were under the age of 18; 0.1% were between the ages of 18 and 24; 25% were from 25 to 44; 28.4% were from 45 to 64; and 18.3% were 65 years of age or older. The gender makeup of the city was 56.7% male and 43.3% female.

=== 2000 census ===
As of the census of 2000, there were 69 people, 29 households, and 20 families residing in the city. The population density was 87.0 inhabitants per square mile (33.6/km^{2}). There were 33 housing units at an average density of 41.6 per square mile (16.1/km^{2}). The racial makeup of the city was 100.00% White.

There were 29 households, out of which 27.6% had children under the age of 18 living with them, 51.7% were married couples living together, 10.3% had a female householder with no husband present, and 31.0% were non-families. 20.7% of all households were made up of individuals, and 10.3% had someone living alone who was 65 years of age or older. The average household size was 2.38 and the average family size was 2.70.

In the city, the population was spread out, with 18.8% under the age of 18, 13.0% from 18 to 24, 18.8% from 25 to 44, 34.8% from 45 to 64, and 14.5% who were 65 years of age or older. The median age was 44 years. For every 100 females, there were 109.1 males. For every 100 females age 18 and over, there were 124.0 males.

The median income for a household in the city was $41,875, and the median income for a family was $41,563. Males had a median income of $27,143 versus $18,438 for females. The per capita income for the city was $14,222. There were 7.4% of families and 11.8% of the population living below the poverty line, including 15.8% of under eighteens and none of those over 64.

== Politics ==
Wilder is located in Minnesota's 1st congressional district, represented by Republican Jim Hagedorn. At the state level, Wilder is located in Senate District 22, represented by Republican Doug Magnus, and in House District 22B, represented by Republican Rod Hamilton.
