= Middletown Township, Jackson County, Minnesota =

Middletown Township, Minnesota
- Township
- Location within the state of Minnesota Middletown Township, Minnesota (the United States)
- Coordinates: 43°32′58″N 95°2′42″W
- Country: United States
- State: Minnesota
- County: Jackson

Area
  - Total: 36.2 sq mi (93.8 km^{2})
  - Land: 35.8 sq mi (92.6 km^{2})
  - Water: 0.46 sq mi (1.2 km^{2})
- Elevation: 1,394 ft (425 m)

Population (2000)
  - Total: 243
  - Density: 6.7/sq mi (2.6/km^{2})
- Time zone: UTC-6 (Central (CST))
  - Summer (DST): UTC-5 (CDT)
- FIPS code: 27-41948
- GNIS feature ID: 0664965

Middletown Township is a township in Jackson County, Minnesota, United States. The population was 243 at the 2000 census.

Middletown Township was organized in 1869, and named for its location between two other townships.

== Geography ==
According to the United States Census Bureau, the township has a total area of 36.2 square miles (93.8 km^{2}), of which 35.8 square miles (92.6 km^{2}) is land and 0.5 square mile (1.2 km^{2}) (1.27%) is water.

== Demographics ==
As of the census of 2000, there were 243 people, 103 households, and 79 families residing in the township. The population density was 6.8 inhabitants per square mile (2.6/km^{2}). There were 114 housing units at an average density of 3.2 per square mile (1.2/km^{2}). The racial makeup of the township was 100.00% White. Hispanic or Latino of any race were 0.41% of the population.

There were 103 households, out of which 29.1% had children under the age of 18 living with them, 67.0% were married couples living together, 3.9% had a female householder with no husband present, and 23.3% were non-families. 23.3% of all households were made up of individuals, and 6.8% had someone living alone who was 65 years of age or older. The average household size was 2.36 and the average family size was 2.73.

In the township the population was spread out, with 20.6% under the age of 18, 6.2% from 18 to 24, 30.9% from 25 to 44, 24.3% from 45 to 64, and 18.1% who were 65 years of age or older. The median age was 42 years. For every 100 females, there were 135.9 males. For every 100 females age 18 and over, there were 144.3 males.

The median income for a household in the township was $39,219, and the median income for a family was $45,000. Males had a median income of $35,417 versus $23,750 for females. The per capita income for the township was $20,394. About 9.7% of families and 9.8% of the population were below the poverty line, including 11.4% of those under the age of eighteen and 18.2% of those 65 or over.

== Politics ==
Middletown Township is located in Minnesota's 1st congressional district, represented by Mankato educator Tim Walz, a Democrat. At the state level, Middletown Township is located in Senate District 22, represented by Republican Doug Magnus, and in House District 22B, represented by Republican Rod Hamilton.
