= Alpha, Minnesota =

City in Minnesota, United States

- City
- Location of Alpha, Minnesota
- Coordinates: 43°38′15″N 94°52′16″W
- Country: United States
- State: Minnesota
- County: Jackson
- Platted: 1895
- Incorporated: July 3, 1899

Government
  - Type: Mayor – Council
  - Mayor: Tim Cain

Area
  - Total: 0.214 sq mi (0.554 km^{2})
  - Land: 0.214 sq mi (0.554 km^{2})
  - Water: 0 sq mi (0.000 km^{2})
- Elevation: 1,388 ft (423 m)

Population (2020)
  - Total: 97
  - Estimate (2022): 97
  - Density: 453.3/sq mi (175.01/km^{2})
- Time zone: UTC−6 (Central (CST))
  - Summer (DST): UTC−5 (CDT)
- ZIP Code: 56111
- Area code: 507
- FIPS code: 27-01162
- GNIS feature ID: 2393928
- Sales tax: 6.875%

Alpha is a city in Jackson County, Minnesota, United States. The population was 97 at the 2020 census.

== History ==
Alpha was platted in 1895. A post office has been in operation at Alpha since 1895. The city was incorporated on July 3, 1899.

== Geography ==
According to the United States Census Bureau, the city has a total area of 0.214 square miles (0.55 km^{2}), all land.

== Demographics ==
Historical population
Census	Pop.	Note	%±
1900	209		—
1910	223		6.7%
1920	261		17.0%
1930	209		−19.9%
1940	229		9.6%
1950	230		0.4%
1960	207		−10.0%
1970	179		−13.5%
1980	180		0.6%
1990	105		−41.7%
2000	126		20.0%
2010	116		−7.9%
2020	97		−16.4%
2022 (est.)	97		0.0%
U.S. Decennial Census; 2020 Census

=== 2010 census ===
As of the 2010 census, there were 116 people, 47 households, and 38 families residing in the city. The population density was 682.4 inhabitants per square mile (263.5/km^{2}). There were 58 housing units at an average density of 341.2 per square mile (131.7/km^{2}). The racial makeup of the city was 94.0% White, 2.6% Asian, 0.9% from other races, and 2.6% from two or more races. Hispanic or Latino of any race were 0.9% of the population.

There were 47 households, of which 27.7% had children under the age of 18 living with them, 59.6% were married couples living together, 8.5% had a female householder with no husband present, 12.8% had a male householder with no wife present, and 19.1% were non-families. 19.1% of all households were made up of individuals, and 12.8% had someone living alone who was 65 years of age or older. The average household size was 2.47 and the average family size was 2.68.

The median age in the city was 43 years. 19.8% of residents were under the age of 18; 7.7% were between the ages of 18 and 24; 24.2% were from 25 to 44; 27.6% were from 45 to 64; and 20.7% were 65 years of age or older. The gender makeup of the city was 54.3% male and 45.7% female.

=== 2000 census ===
As of the 2000 census, there were 126 people, 52 households, and 34 families residing in the city. The population density was 711.5 inhabitants per square mile (274.7/km^{2}). There were 61 housing units at an average density of 344.4 per square mile (133.0/km^{2}). The racial makeup of the city was 98.41% White and 1.59% Asian. Hispanic or Latino of any race were 0.79% of the population.

There were 52 households, out of which 28.8% had children under the age of 18 living with them, 59.6% were married couples living together, 3.8% had a female householder with no husband present, and 32.7% were non-families. 26.9% of all households were made up of individuals, and 13.5% had someone living alone who was 65 years of age or older. The average household size was 2.42 and the average family size was 2.91.

In the city, the population was spread out, with 24.6% under the age of 18, 6.3% from 18 to 24, 28.6% from 25 to 44, 23.8% from 45 to 64, and 16.7% who were 65 years of age or older. The median age was 38 years. For every 100 females, there were 93.8 males. For every 100 females age 18 and over, there were 102.1 males.

The median income for a household in the city was $41,750, and the median income for a family was $46,250. Males had a median income of $26,563 versus $17,000 for females. The per capita income for the city was $18,769. There were no families and 2.4% of the population living below the poverty line, including no under eighteens and 4.8% of those over 64.

== Politics ==
Alpha is located in Minnesota's 1st congressional district, represented by Republican Brad Finstad. At the state level, Alpha is located in Senate District 22, represented by Republican Doug Magnus, and in House District 22B, represented by Republican Rod Hamilton. Tim Cain is the mayor of Alpha.
