= Sioux Valley, Minnesota =

Unincorporated community in Minnesota, United States

Sioux Valley
- Unincorporated community
- Location within Minnesota Location within the United States
- Coordinates: 43°32′38″N 95°18′17″W
- Country: United States
- State: Minnesota
- County: Jackson
- Township: Sioux Valley
- Elevation: 1,473 ft (449 m)
- Time zone: UTC-6 (Central (CST))
  - Summer (DST): UTC-5 (CDT)
- GNIS feature ID: 652087

Sioux Valley is an unincorporated community in Sioux Valley Township, Jackson County, Minnesota, United States.
