= Sioux Valley Township, Jackson County, Minnesota =

Sioux Valley Township, Minnesota
- Township
- Location within the state of Minnesota Sioux Valley Township, Minnesota (the United States)
- Coordinates: 43°32′25″N 95°15′54″W
- Country: United States
- State: Minnesota
- County: Jackson

Area
  - Total: 36.2 sq mi (93.8 km^{2})
  - Land: 35.7 sq mi (92.4 km^{2})
  - Water: 0.50 sq mi (1.3 km^{2})
- Elevation: 1,460 ft (445 m)

Population (2010)
  - Total: 192
  - Density: 5.2/sq mi (2/km^{2})
- Time zone: UTC-6 (Central (CST))
  - Summer (DST): UTC-5 (CDT)
- FIPS code: 27-60574
- GNIS feature ID: 0665622

Sioux Valley Township is a township in Jackson County, Minnesota, United States. The population was 192 as of the 2010 census.

== History ==
Sioux Valley Township was organized in 1874, and named for the Little Sioux River valley.

== Geography ==
According to the United States Census Bureau, the township has a total area of 36.2 square miles (93.8 km^{2}), of which 35.7 square miles (92.4 km^{2}) is land and 0.5 square mile (1.3 km^{2}) (1.41%) is water.

== Demographics ==
As of the census of 2010, there were 192 people, 75 households, and 61 families residing in the township. The population density was 5.3 people per square mile (2.0/km^{2}). There were 89 housing units at an average density of 2.5/sq mi (0.9/km^{2}). The racial makeup of the township was 100% White. Hispanic or Latino of any race were 1.6% of the population.

There were 75 households, out of which 28% had children under the age of 18 living with them, 76% were married couples living together, 2.7% had a female householder with no husband present, and 18.7% were non-families. 16% of all households were made up of individuals, and 6.7% had someone living alone who was 65 years of age or older. The average household size was 2.56 and the average family size was 2.85. There were 107 males and 85 females in the township. The median age was 47, with 77.1% of the population being 18 years or over.

According to the American Community Survey estimate for 2013, the median income in the township for a household was $62,813, and for a family was $68,125. About 6.8% of the population lived below the poverty line, including 7.1% of those under the age of eighteen and 15.8% of those 65 or over.

== Politics ==
Sioux Valley Township is located in Minnesota's 1st congressional district, represented by Mankato educator Tim Walz, a Democrat. At the state level, Sioux Valley Township is located in Senate District 22, represented by Democrat Bill Weber, and in House District 22B, represented by Republican Rod Hamilton.
