= Ewington Township, Jackson County, Minnesota =

Ewington Township, Minnesota
- Township
- Location within the state of Minnesota Ewington Township, Minnesota (the United States)
- Coordinates: 43°37′23″N 95°24′19″W
- Country: United States
- State: Minnesota
- County: Jackson

Area
  - Total: 35.8 sq mi (92.6 km^{2})
  - Land: 35.8 sq mi (92.6 km^{2})
  - Water: 0 sq mi (0.0 km^{2})
- Elevation: 1,480 ft (451 m)

Population (2000)
  - Total: 233
  - Density: 6.5/sq mi (2.5/km^{2})
- Time zone: UTC-6 (Central (CST))
  - Summer (DST): UTC-5 (CDT)
- FIPS code: 27-20042
- GNIS feature ID: 0664121

Ewington Township is a township in Jackson County, Minnesota, United States. The population was 233 at the 2000 census.

== History ==
Ewington Township was organized in 1873, and named for Thomas C. Ewing, a pioneer settler.

== Geography ==
According to the United States Census Bureau, the township has a total area of 35.7 square miles (92 km^{2}), all land.

== Demographics ==
As of the census of 2000, there were 233 people, 97 households, and 77 families residing in the township. The population density was 6.5 inhabitants per square mile (2.5/km^{2}). There were 105 housing units at an average density of 2.9 per square mile (1.1/km^{2}). The racial makeup of the township was 99.57% White and 0.43% Asian.

There were 97 households, out of which 27.8% had children under the age of 18 living with them, 72.2% were married couples living together, and 20.6% were non-families. 18.6% of all households were made up of individuals, and 5.2% had someone living alone who was 65 years of age or older. The average household size was 2.40 and the average family size was 2.68.

In the township the population was spread out, with 20.6% under the age of 18, 4.3% from 18 to 24, 30.0% from 25 to 44, 30.9% from 45 to 64, and 14.2% who were 65 years of age or older. The median age was 42 years. For every 100 females, there were 99.1 males. For every 100 females age 18 and over, there were 110.2 males.

The median income for a household in the township was $41,458, and the median income for a family was $48,750. Males had a median income of $29,375 versus $26,250 for females. The per capita income for the township was $19,371. About 2.6% of families and 3.9% of the population were below the poverty line, including none of those under the age of eighteen and 15.2% of those 65 or over.

== Politics ==
Ewington Township is located in Minnesota's 1st congressional district, represented by Mankato educator Tim Walz, a Democrat. At the state level, Ewington Township is located in Senate District 22, represented by Republican Doug Magnus, and in House District 22B, represented by Republican Rod Hamilton.
