= Alba Township, Jackson County, Minnesota =

Alba Township, Minnesota
- Township
- Location within the state of Minnesota Alba Township, Minnesota (the United States)
- Coordinates: 43°43′29″N 95°24′20″W
- Country: United States
- State: Minnesota
- County: Jackson

Area
  - Total: 35.3 sq mi (91.4 km^{2})
  - Land: 35.3 sq mi (91.4 km^{2})
  - Water: 0 sq mi (0.0 km^{2})
- Elevation: 1,430 ft (436 m)

Population (2000)
  - Total: 200
  - Density: 5.7/sq mi (2.2/km^{2})
- Time zone: UTC-6 (Central (CST))
  - Summer (DST): UTC-5 (CDT)
- FIPS code: 27-00604
- GNIS feature ID: 0663396

Alba Township is a township in Jackson County, Minnesota, United States. The population was 200 at the 2000 census.

== History ==
Alba Township was organized in 1872, and named for the Latin word meaning "white".

== Geography ==
According to the United States Census Bureau, the township has a total area of 35.3 square miles (91 km^{2}), of which 35.3 square miles (91 km^{2}) is land and 0.03% is water.

== Demographics ==
As of the census of 2000, there were 200 people, 77 households, and 58 families residing in the township. The population density was 5.7 people per square mile (2.2/km^{2}). There were 85 housing units at an average density of 2.4/sq mi (0.9/km^{2}). The racial makeup of the township was 97.50% White, and 2.50% from two or more races. Hispanic or Latino of any race were 3.00% of the population.

There were 77 households, out of which 31.2% had children under the age of 18 living with them, 68.8% were married couples living together, 2.6% had a female householder with no husband present, and 23.4% were non-families. 23.4% of all households were made up of individuals, and 13.0% had someone living alone who was 65 years of age or older. The average household size was 2.60 and the average family size was 3.05.

In the township the population was spread out, with 27.0% under the age of 18, 4.0% from 18 to 24, 23.0% from 25 to 44, 27.5% from 45 to 64, and 18.5% who were 65 years of age or older. The median age was 42 years. For every 100 females, there were 92.3 males. For every 100 females age 18 and over, there were 100.0 males.

The median income for a household in the township was $25,179, and the median income for a family was $26,250. Males had a median income of $23,750 versus $16,250 for females. The per capita income for the township was $13,699. About 9.1% of families and 10.7% of the population were below the poverty line, including 18.4% of those under the age of eighteen and none of those sixty five or over.

== Politics ==
Alba Township is located in Minnesota's 1st congressional district, represented by Mankato educator Tim Walz, a Democrat. At the state level, Alba Township is located in Senate District 22, represented by Republican Doug Magnus, and in House District 22B, represented by Republican Rod Hamilton.
