= Petersburg, Minnesota =

Unincorporated community in Minnesota, United States

Petersburg
- Unincorporated community
- Location within Minnesota Location within the United States
- Coordinates: 43°31′49″N 94°55′08″W
- Country: United States
- State: Minnesota
- County: Jackson
- Township: Petersburg
- Elevation: 1,312 ft (400 m)
- Time zone: UTC-6 (Central (CST))
  - Summer (DST): UTC-5 (CDT)
- GNIS feature ID: 649318

Petersburg is an unincorporated community in Petersburg Township, Jackson County, Minnesota, United States.
