= Miloma, Minnesota =

Unincorporated community in Minnesota, United States

Miloma
- Unincorporated community
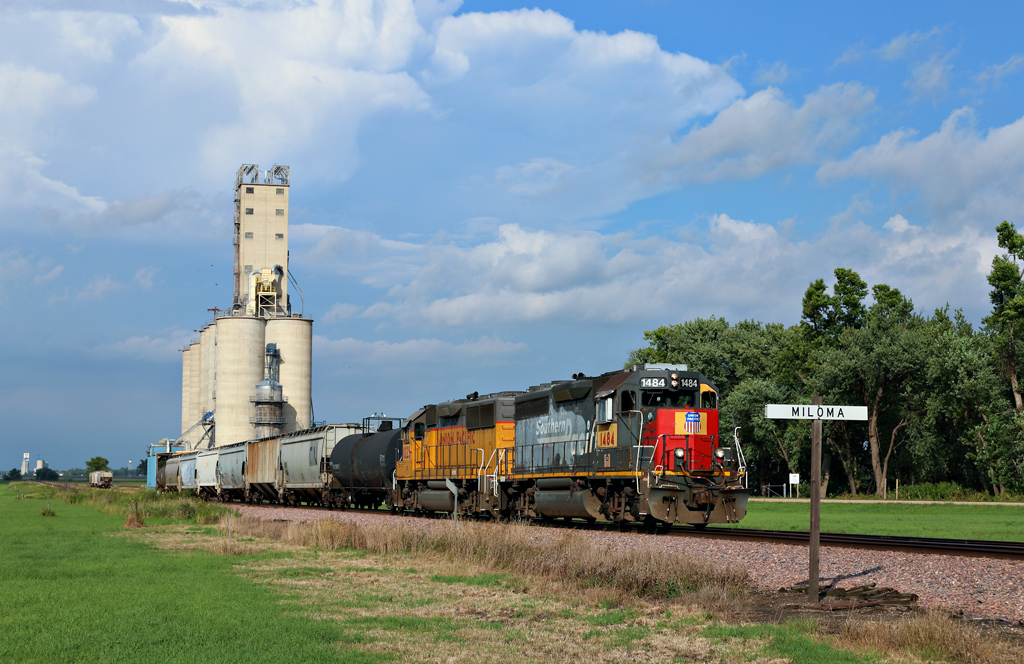
- Miloma in 2014

- Location within Minnesota Location within the United States
- Coordinates: 43°45′46″N 95°22′06″W
- Country: United States
- State: Minnesota
- County: Jackson
- Township: La Crosse
- Elevation: 1,431 ft (436 m)
- Time zone: UTC-6 (Central (CST))
  - Summer (DST): UTC-5 (CDT)
- Area code: 507
- GNIS feature ID: 654830

Miloma is an unincorporated community located in Jackson County, Minnesota, United States at latitude 43.763 and longitude -95.368 (Miloma Panoramio Photos). The elevation is 1,427 feet. Miloma appears on the Heron Lake U.S. Geological Survey Map.

== History ==
Miloma was originally called Prairie Junction, and under the latter name was founded in about 1879 when the railroad was extended to that point. The present name of the community is a double contraction, Milwaukee and Omaha, from the names of two railroads, the Chicago, Milwaukee & Saint Paul and the Chicago, Minneapolis & Omaha. A post office was established under the name Prairie Junction in 1881, the name was changed to Miloma in 1906, and the post office closed in 1930.
