= Wisconsin Dells =

Wisconsin Dells may refer to:

- Wisconsin Dells, Wisconsin
- The Dells of the Wisconsin River

== See also ==
- Dell (disambiguation)
- Wisconsin (disambiguation)
