= Wisconsin Township, Jackson County, Minnesota =

Wisconsin Township, Minnesota
- Township
- Location within the state of Minnesota Wisconsin Township, Minnesota (the United States)
- Coordinates: 43°37′58″N 94°54′30″W
- Country: United States
- State: Minnesota
- County: Jackson

Area
  - Total: 35.5 sq mi (92.0 km^{2})
  - Land: 35.5 sq mi (92.0 km^{2})
  - Water: 0 sq mi (0.0 km^{2})
- Elevation: 1,401 ft (427 m)

Population (2000)
  - Total: 263
  - Density: 7.5/sq mi (2.9/km^{2})
- Time zone: UTC-6 (Central (CST))
  - Summer (DST): UTC-5 (CDT)
- FIPS code: 27-71212
- GNIS feature ID: 0666032

Wisconsin Township is a township in Jackson County, Minnesota, United States. The population was 263 at the 2000 census.

== History ==
Wisconsin Township was organized in 1869. A large share of the first settlers being natives of Wisconsin caused the name to be selected.

== Geography ==
According to the United States Census Bureau, the township has a total area of 35.5 square miles (92.0 km^{2}), all land.

== Demographics ==
As of the census of 2000, there were 263 people, 103 households, and 86 families residing in the township. The population density was 7.4 people per square mile (2.9/km^{2}). There were 111 housing units at an average density of 3.1/sq mi (1.2/km^{2}). The racial makeup of the township was 99.62% White, and 0.38% from two or more races. Hispanic or Latino of any race were 1.14% of the population.

There were 103 households, out of which 35.9% had children under the age of 18 living with them, 75.7% were married couples living together, 2.9% had a female householder with no husband present, and 16.5% were non-families. 14.6% of all households were made up of individuals, and 2.9% had someone living alone who was 65 years of age or older. The average household size was 2.55 and the average family size was 2.83.

In the township the population was spread out, with 25.1% under the age of 18, 3.8% from 18 to 24, 31.6% from 25 to 44, 23.2% from 45 to 64, and 16.3% who were 65 years of age or older. The median age was 40 years. For every 100 females, there were 112.1 males. For every 100 females age 18 and over, there were 118.9 males.

The median income for a household in the township was $46,607, and the median income for a family was $49,375. Males had a median income of $31,667 versus $20,357 for females. The per capita income for the township was $16,996. None of the families and 1.4% of the population were living below the poverty line, including no under eighteens and 8.2% of those over 64.

== Politics ==
Wisconsin Township is located in Minnesota's 1st congressional district, represented by Mankato educator Tim Walz, a Democrat. At the state level, Wisconsin Township is located in Senate District 22, represented by Republican Doug Magnus, and in House District 22B, represented by Republican Rod Hamilton.
