= Kimball Township, Jackson County, Minnesota =

Kimball Township, Minnesota
- Township
- Location within the state of Minnesota Kimball Township, Minnesota (the United States)
- Coordinates: 43°48′17″N 94°54′46″W
- Country: United States
- State: Minnesota
- County: Jackson

Area
  - Total: 36.0 sq mi (93.2 km^{2})
  - Land: 35.9 sq mi (93.1 km^{2})
  - Water: 0.039 sq mi (0.1 km^{2})
- Elevation: 1,342 ft (409 m)

Population (2000)
  - Total: 158
  - Density: 4.4/sq mi (1.7/km^{2})
- Time zone: UTC-6 (Central (CST))
  - Summer (DST): UTC-5 (CDT)
- FIPS code: 27-33146
- GNIS feature ID: 0664631

Kimball Township is a township in Jackson County, Minnesota, United States. The population was 158 at the 2000 census.

Kimball Township was organized in 1872, and named for Wilbur S. Kimball, a storekeeper.

== Geography ==
According to the United States Census Bureau, the township has a total area of 36.0 square miles (93 km^{2}), of which 35.9 square miles (93 km^{2}) is land and 0.04 square miles (0.10 km^{2}) (0.11%) is water.

== Demographics ==
As of the 2000 census, the township included 158 people, 59 households and 49 families. The population density was 4.4 inhabitants per square mile (1.7/km^{2}). There were 64 housing units at an average density of 1.8 per square mile (0.69/km^{2}). The racial makeup of the township was 94.30% White, 5.70% from other races. Hispanic or Latino of any race were 5.06% of the population.

There were 59 households, out of which 40.7% had children under the age of 18 living with them, 79.7% were married couples living together, 1.7% had a female householder with no husband present, and 15.3% were non-families. 13.6% of all households were made up of individuals, and 10.2% had someone living alone who was 65 years of age or older. The average household size was 2.68 and the average family size was 2.96.

In the township the population was spread out, with 29.7% under the age of 18, 2.5% from 18 to 24, 25.9% from 25 to 44, 23.4% from 45 to 64, and 18.4% who were 65 years of age or older. The median age was 40 years. For every 100 females, there were 125.7 males. For every 100 females age 18 and over, there were 113.5 males.

The median income for a household in the township was $45,938, and the median income for a family was $46,875. Males had a median income of $33,750 versus $14,375 for females. The per capita income for the township was $20,358. About 4.7% of families and 5.7% of the population were below the poverty line, including none of those under the age of eighteen and 13.3% of those 65 or over.

== Politics ==
Kimball Township is located in Minnesota's 1st congressional district, represented by Mankato educator Jim Hagedorn, a Republican. At the state level, Kimball Township is located in Senate District 22, represented by Republican Bill Weber, and in House District 22B, represented by Republican Rod Hamilton.
