= Alba Township =

Alba Township may refer to the following townships in the United States:

- Alba Township, Henry County, Illinois
- Alba Township, Jackson County, Minnesota
