= La Crosse Township, Jackson County, Minnesota =

La Crosse Township, Minnesota
- Township
- Location within the state of Minnesota La Crosse Township, Minnesota (the United States)
- Coordinates: 43°47′50″N 95°23′43″W
- Country: United States
- State: Minnesota
- County: Jackson

Area
  - Total: 34.9 sq mi (90.5 km^{2})
  - Land: 34.9 sq mi (90.3 km^{2})
  - Water: 0.077 sq mi (0.2 km^{2})
- Elevation: 1,434 ft (437 m)

Population (2000)
  - Total: 180
  - Density: 5.2/sq mi (2/km^{2})
- Time zone: UTC-6 (Central (CST))
  - Summer (DST): UTC-5 (CDT)
- FIPS code: 27-33902
- GNIS feature ID: 0664653

La Crosse Township is a township in Jackson County, Minnesota, United States. The population was 180 at the 2000 census.

La Crosse Township was organized in 1872, and named after La Crosse, Wisconsin, the native home of a large share of the early settlers.

== Geography ==
According to the United States Census Bureau, the township has a total area of 34.9 square miles (90 km^{2}), of which 34.9 square miles (90 km^{2}) is land and 0.1 square miles (0.26 km^{2}) (0.20%) is water.

== Demographics ==
As of the census of 2000, there were 180 people, 62 households, and 55 families residing in the township. The population density was 5.2 inhabitants per square mile (2.0/km^{2}). There were 68 housing units at an average density of 2.0 per square mile (0.77/km^{2}). The racial makeup of the township was 99.44% White and 0.56% African American.

There were 62 households, out of which 37.1% had children under the age of 18 living with them, 82.3% were married couples living together, 6.5% had a female householder with no husband present, and 9.7% were non-families. 6.5% of all households were made up of individuals, and none had someone living alone who was 65 years of age or older. The average household size was 2.90 and the average family size was 3.02.

In the township the population was spread out, with 27.2% under the age of 18, 7.8% from 18 to 24, 17.8% from 25 to 44, 26.1% from 45 to 64, and 21.1% who were 65 years of age or older. The median age was 43 years. For every 100 females, there were 116.9 males. For every 100 females age 18 and over, there were 107.9 males.

The median income for a household in the township was $40,000, and the median income for a family was $39,375. Males had a median income of $26,458 versus $29,500 for females. The per capita income for the township was $15,851. About 8.1% of families and 6.4% of the population were below the poverty line, including 8.7% of those under the age of eighteen and none of those 65 or over.

== Politics ==
La Crosse Township is located in Minnesota's 1st congressional district, represented by Mankato educator Tim Walz, a Democrat. At the state level, La Crosse Township is located in Senate District 22, represented by Republican Doug Magnus, and in House District 22B, represented by Republican Rod Hamilton.
