= Ⱨajoti Miⱨnati =

Bukharian-language literary journal

Ⱨajoti Miⱨnati ('Toiling Life'), later Adabijoti Soveti ('Soviet Literature'), was a Jewish-Bukharian literary and sociopolitical bimonthly journal published in Tashkent in the Uzbek SSR from 1931 to 1941. It was an organ for the Bukharian-Jewish section of the Union of Writers of the Uzbek SSR (the republic-level affiliate of the Union of Soviet Writers). Its editors were Aron Saidov, Menashe Aminov and Yunatan Kurayev.

== Founding of a Soviet Bukharian-Jewish literary journal ==
Ⱨajoti Miⱨnati was founded in 1931. The magazine emerged out of the literary supplement of the newspaper Bajroqi Miⱨnat ('Banner of Labour'). Initially Ⱨajoti Miⱨnati was printed in 2,500 copies, but by 1933 its circulation increased to 5,000 copies of each issue. Issues of Ⱨajoti Miⱨnati were several dozen pages long. The magazine contained poems and short stories by Bukharan Jewish writers. It would also carry translations of texts by Russian writers like Alexander Pushkin and Maxim Gorky. Ңajoti Miⱨnati became, along with the literary page of Bajroqi Miⱨnat, the most important platform for publishing of Bukharian-Jewish literature. Prominent educators took part in producing the magazine.

== 1931 language survey ==
In 1931 Ңajoti Miⱨnati asked readers for their feedback on the language used in the journal. 785 written answers were sent in from all over Central Asia, from locations such as Samarkand, Bukhara, Kokand, Namangan, Andijon and Karmana. About two thirds of the respondents stated that they considered the language satisfactory, while a minority argued that usage of new words made the texts difficult to understand.

== Cyrillization and closure ==
In 1935 the name of the publication was changed to Adabijoti Soveti. As part of the Cyrillization reforms in the Soviet Union in the late 1930s, the writing of Jewish-Bukharian language was changed from Latin to Cyrillic script in 1939. However at this point the main newspaper (Bajroqi Miⱨnat) and the Jewish-Bukharian schools had already been closed down. Adabijoti Soveti became the sole remaining publication available for the implementation of the switch to Cyrillic script. The first Cyrillic script issue of Adabijoti Soveti was number 11, published in November 1940. The last known issue of Adabijoti Soveti was published in May 1941; presumably publishing was discontinued after the German attack on the Soviet Union that year.
