= Petersburg Township =

Petersburg Township may refer to:

- Petersburg Township, Jackson County, Minnesota
- Petersburg Township, Nelson County, North Dakota, in Nelson County, North Dakota
