= Marj Fogelman =

American politician

Member of the Minnesota House of Representatives from the 21B district
- Incumbent
- Assumed office January 3, 2023
- Preceded by: Rod Hamilton

Personal details
- Born: June 10, 1972 (age 54)
- Party: Republican
- Spouse: Michael
- Children: 4
- Education: Southwest Wisconsin Technical College
- Occupation: Business owner; Legislator
- Website: Government website Campaign website

Marj Fogelman (born June 10, 1972) is an American politician serving in the Minnesota House of Representatives since 2023. A member of the Republican Party of Minnesota, Fogelman represents District 21B in southwestern Minnesota, which includes the city of Worthington and parts of Cottonwood, Jackson, Martin, Nobles, and Watonwan Counties.

== Early life, education and career ==
Fogelman received an associate degree in accounting from Southwestern Technical College.

== Minnesota House of Representatives ==
Fogelman was elected to the Minnesota House of Representatives in 2022. She first ran for an open seat after legislative redistricting and the retirement of nine-term Republican incumbent Rod Hamilton. Fogelman serves on the Capital Investment and Transportation Finance and Policy Committees.

== Electoral history ==
2022 Minnesota State House - District 21B
Party	Candidate	Votes	%
Republican	Marj Fogelman	9,437	66.50
Democratic (DFL)	Michael Heidelberger	4,727	33.31
Write-in		26	0.18
Total votes		14,190	100.0
Republican hold			

== Personal life ==
Fogelman lives in Fulda, Minnesota, with her husband, Michael, and has four children.
