= Christiania Township, Jackson County, Minnesota =

Township in the United States

Christiania Township, Minnesota
- Township
- Location within the state of Minnesota Christiania Township (the United States)
- Coordinates: 43°48′17″N 95°2′42″W
- Country: United States
- State: Minnesota
- County: Jackson

Area
  - Total: 36.2 sq mi (93.8 km^{2})
  - Land: 35.4 sq mi (91.8 km^{2})
  - Water: 0.77 sq mi (2.0 km^{2})
- Elevation: 1,385 ft (422 m)

Population (2000)
  - Total: 331
  - Density: 9.3/sq mi (3.6/km^{2})
- Time zone: UTC-6 (Central (CST))
  - Summer (DST): UTC-5 (CDT)
- FIPS code: 27-11476
- GNIS feature ID: 0663801

Christiania Township is a township in Jackson County, Minnesota, United States. The population was 331 at the 2000 census. It contains the census-designated place of Fish Lake.

Christiania Township was organized in 1871. Christiana is an old name for Oslo, Norway.

== Geography ==
According to the United States Census Bureau, the township has a total area of 36.2 square miles (94 km^{2}), of which 35.5 square miles (92 km^{2}) is land and 0.8 square miles (2.1 km^{2}) (2.18%) is water.

== Demographics ==
As of the census of 2000, there were 331 people, 128 households, and 98 families residing in the township. The population density was 9.3 inhabitants per square mile (3.6/km^{2}). There were 190 housing units at an average density of 5.4 per square mile (2.1/km^{2}). The racial makeup of the township was 97.58% White, 1.51% from other races, and 0.91% from two or more races. Hispanic or Latino of any race were 1.51% of the population.

There were 128 households, out of which 29.7% had children under the age of 18 living with them, 70.3% were married couples living together, 3.9% had a female householder with no husband present, and 22.7% were non-families. 22.7% of all households were made up of individuals, and 4.7% had someone living alone who was 65 years of age or older. The average household size was 2.59 and the average family size was 3.00.

In the township the population was spread out, with 26.6% under the age of 18, 5.4% from 18 to 24, 23.9% from 25 to 44, 31.4% from 45 to 64, and 12.7% who were 65 years of age or older. The median age was 43 years. For every 100 females, there were 119.2 males. For every 100 females age 18 and over, there were 115.0 males.

The median income for a household in the township was $41,172, and the median income for a family was $48,125. Males had a median income of $32,500 versus $18,906 for females. The per capita income for the township was $19,565. About 1.9% of families and 1.7% of the population were below the poverty line, including none of those under age 18 and 3.9% of those age 65 or over.

== Politics ==
Christiania Township is located in Minnesota's 1st congressional district, represented by Brad Finstad, a Republican Party (United States). At the state level, Christiania Township is located in Senate District 21, represented by Republican Bill Weber (Minnesota politician), and in House District 21B, represented by Republican Marj Fogelman.
