= Spafford, Minnesota =

Unincorporated community in Minnesota, United States

Spafford
- Unincorporated community
- Location within Minnesota Location within the United States
- Coordinates: 43°36′58″N 95°22′19″W
- Country: United States
- State: Minnesota
- County: Jackson
- Township: Ewington
- Elevation: 1,483 ft (452 m)
- Time zone: UTC-6 (Central (CST))
  - Summer (DST): UTC-5 (CDT)
- GNIS feature ID: 654952

Spafford is an unincorporated community in Ewington Township, Jackson County, Minnesota, United States.
