= Minneota =

Minneota can refer to a community in the United States:

- Minneota, Minnesota
- Minneota Township, Jackson County, Minnesota
