= Delafield Township, Jackson County, Minnesota =

Delafield Township, Minnesota
- Township
- Location within the state of Minnesota Delafield Township, Minnesota (the United States)
- Coordinates: 43°48′43″N 95°8′44″W
- Country: United States
- State: Minnesota
- County: Jackson

Area
  - Total: 35.1 sq mi (90.8 km^{2})
  - Land: 34.7 sq mi (89.8 km^{2})
  - Water: 0.39 sq mi (1.0 km^{2})
- Elevation: 1,430 ft (436 m)

Population (2000)
  - Total: 281
  - Density: 8.0/sq mi (3.1/km^{2})
- Time zone: UTC-6 (Central (CST))
  - Summer (DST): UTC-5 (CDT)
- FIPS code: 27-15436
- GNIS feature ID: 0663954

Delafield Township is a township in Jackson County, Minnesota, United States. The population was 281 at the 2000 census.

== History ==
Delafield Township was organized in 1870.

== Geography ==
According to the United States Census Bureau, the township has a total area of 35.1 square miles (91 km^{2}), of which 34.7 square miles (90 km^{2}) is land and 0.4 square miles (1.0 km^{2}) (1.14%) is water.

== Demographics ==
As of the census of 2000, there were 281 people, 110 households, and 91 families residing in the township. The population density was 8.1 inhabitants per square mile (3.1/km^{2}). There were 119 housing units at an average density of 3.4 per square mile (1.3/km^{2}). The racial makeup of the township was 100.00% White.

There were 110 households, out of which 30.9% had children under the age of 18 living with them, 77.3% were married couples living together, 1.8% had a female householder with no husband present, and 16.4% were non-families. 14.5% of all households were made up of individuals, and 7.3% had someone living alone who was 65 years of age or older. The average household size was 2.55 and the average family size was 2.82.

In the township the population was spread out, with 21.7% under the age of 18, 6.4% from 18 to 24, 27.8% from 25 to 44, 24.2% from 45 to 64, and 19.9% who were 65 years of age or older. The median age was 43 years. For every 100 females, there were 108.1 males. For every 100 females age 18 and over, there were 111.5 males.

The median income for a household in the township was $37,750, and the median income for a family was $46,250. Males had a median income of $26,719 versus $18,125 for females. The per capita income for the township was $18,258. About 10.3% of families and 15.2% of the population were below the poverty line, including 28.8% of those under the age of eighteen and 3.7% of those 65 or over.

== Politics ==
Delafield Township is located in Minnesota's 1st congressional district, represented by Blue Earth, Minnesota native Jim Hagedorn, a Republican. At the state level, Delafield Township is located in Senate District 22, represented by Republican Bill Weber (politician), and in House District 22B, represented by Republican Rod Hamilton.
