= Kimball Township =

Kimball Township may refer to:

- Kimball Township, Michigan
- Kimball Township, Jackson County, Minnesota
- Kimball Township, Brule County, South Dakota, in Brule County, South Dakota
