= Petersburg Township, Jackson County, Minnesota =

Petersburg Township, Minnesota
- Township
- Location within the state of Minnesota Petersburg Township, Minnesota (the United States)
- Coordinates: 43°33′0″N 94°54′15″W
- Country: United States
- State: Minnesota
- County: Jackson

Area
  - Total: 36.1 sq mi (93.5 km^{2})
  - Land: 36.1 sq mi (93.5 km^{2})
  - Water: 0.039 sq mi (0.1 km^{2})
- Elevation: 1,388 ft (423 m)

Population (2000)
  - Total: 269
  - Density: 7.5/sq mi (2.9/km^{2})
- Time zone: UTC-6 (Central (CST))
  - Summer (DST): UTC-5 (CDT)
- FIPS code: 27-50578
- GNIS feature ID: 0665289

Petersburg Township is a township in Jackson County, Minnesota, United States. The population was 269 at the 2000 census.

== History ==
Petersburg Township was organized in 1866, and named for Peter Baker, an early settler.

== Geography ==
According to the United States Census Bureau, the township has a total area of 36.1 square miles (93.6 km^{2}), of which 36.1 square miles (93.5 km^{2}) is land and 0.04 square mile (0.1 km^{2}) (0.08%) is water.

== Demographics ==
As of the census of 2000, there were 269 people, 103 households, and 83 families residing in the township. The population density was 7.5 people per square mile (2.9/km^{2}). There were 117 housing units at an average density of 3.2/sq mi (1.3/km^{2}). The racial makeup of the township was 99.63% White and 0.37% Asian.

There were 103 households, out of which 29.1% had children under the age of 18 living with them, 76.7% were married couples living together, 1.0% had a female householder with no husband present, and 19.4% were non-families. 13.6% of all households were made up of individuals, and 6.8% had someone living alone who was 65 years of age or older. The average household size was 2.61 and the average family size was 2.92.

In the township the population was spread out, with 21.6% under the age of 18, 4.5% from 18 to 24, 28.6% from 25 to 44, 26.8% from 45 to 64, and 18.6% who were 65 years of age or older. The median age was 42 years. For every 100 females, there were 102.3 males. For every 100 females age 18 and over, there were 115.3 males.

The median income for a household in the township was $44,688, and the median income for a family was $48,333. Males had a median income of $27,250 versus $19,219 for females. The per capita income for the township was $16,799. About 3.6% of families and 6.4% of the population were below the poverty line, including 2.9% of those under the age of eighteen and none of those 65 or over.

== Politics ==
Petersburg Township is located in Minnesota's 1st congressional district, represented by Mankato educator Tim Walz, a Democrat. At the state level, Petersburg Township is located in Senate District 22, represented by Republican Doug Magnus, and in House District 22B, represented by Republican Rod Hamilton.
