= Wisconsin (disambiguation) =

Wisconsin is a constituent state of the United States of America.

Wisconsin may also refer to:

== Schools ==
- University of Wisconsin System, the public university system in the state of Wisconsin
  - University of Wisconsin–Madison, the flagship campus of this system
- Wisconsin Lutheran College, a private university affiliated with the Wisconsin Evangelical Lutheran Synod

== Ships ==
- USS Wisconsin (BB-9), a battleship launched in 1898
- USS Wisconsin (BB-64), a battleship launched in 1943
- USS Wisconsin (SSBN-827), a planned ballistic missile submarine
- SS Wisconsin, a steamboat that sank in Lake Michigan in 1929

== Places ==
- Wisconsin Dells, Wisconsin, a city
- Wisconsin Junction, Wisconsin, an unincorporated community
- Wisconsin Rapids, Wisconsin, a city
- Lake Wisconsin, Wisconsin, a census-designated place
- Wisconsin River, a river in the state of Wisconsin
- Wisconsin Territory, a U.S. territory from 1836 to 1848
- Wisconsin Township, Jackson County, Minnesota
- Wisconsin Range, a mountain range in Antarctica

== Transport ==
- Wisconsin Coach Lines, a commuter bus service
- Air Wisconsin (airline call sign "Wisconsin")

== Other uses ==
- Wisconsin glaciation, most recent glaciation event in North America
- Wisconsin Avenue, a street in Washington, D.C.
- Wisconsin Center, a convention and exhibition center in downtown Milwaukee, Wisconsin
- Wisconsin (album), a 1987 album by The Crucifucks
- Wisconsin (statue), a statue by Daniel Chester French, on top of the Wisconsin Capitol Building in Madison

== See also ==
- Wisconsin Plan, a proposal to end World War I
