= Rost Township, Jackson County, Minnesota =

Rost Township, Minnesota
- Township
- Location within the state of Minnesota Rost Township, Minnesota (the United States)
- Coordinates: 43°37′8″N 95°17′5″W
- Country: United States
- State: Minnesota
- County: Jackson

Area
  - Total: 36.1 sq mi (93.5 km^{2})
  - Land: 36.1 sq mi (93.5 km^{2})
  - Water: 0 sq mi (0.0 km^{2})
- Elevation: 1,440 ft (440 m)

Population (2000)
  - Total: 250
  - Density: 7.0/sq mi (2.7/km^{2})
- Time zone: UTC-6 (Central (CST))
  - Summer (DST): UTC-5 (CDT)
- FIPS code: 27-55996
- GNIS feature ID: 0665475

Rost Township is a township in Jackson County, Minnesota, United States. The population was 250 at the 2000 census.

== History ==
Rost Township was organized in 1874, and named for Frederick Rost, a pioneer settler.

== Geography ==
According to the United States Census Bureau, the township has a total area of 36.1 square miles (93.5 km^{2}), all land.

== Demographics ==
As of the census^{2} of 2000, there were 250 people, 91 households, and 75 families residing in the township. The population density was 2.7/km^{2} (6.9/mi^{2}). There were 98 housing units at an average density of 1.0/km^{2} (2.7/mi^{2}). The racial makeup of the township was 99.60% White, and 0.40% Native American.

There were 91 households, out of which 34.1% had children under the age of 18 living with them, 80.2% were married couples living together, 1.1% had a female householder with no husband present, and 16.5% were non-families. 14.3% of all households were made up of individuals, and 4.4% had someone living alone who was 65 years of age or older. The average household size was 2.75 and the average family size was 3.04.

In the township the population was spread out, with 25.6% under the age of 18, 8.4% from 18 to 24, 26.0% from 25 to 44, 24.0% from 45 to 64, and 16.0% who were 65 years of age or older. The median age was 40 years. For every 100 females, there were 96.9 males. For every 100 females age 18 and over, there were 121.4 males.

The median income for a household in the township was $43,056, and the median income for a family was $44,167. Males had a median income of $31,146 versus $23,750 for females. The per capita income for the township was $16,820. About 5.4% of families and 3.2% of the population were below the poverty line, including none of those under the age of eighteen and 9.4% of those 65 or over.

== Politics ==
Rost Township is located in Minnesota's 1st congressional district, represented by Mankato educator Tim Walz, a Democrat. At the state level, Rost Township is located in Senate District 22, represented by Republican Doug Magnus, and in House District 22B, represented by Republican Rod Hamilton.
