= Henry Jackson (Minnesota pioneer) =

American pioneer

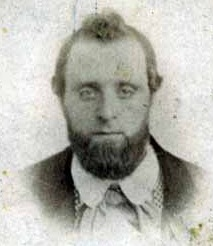
- Henry Jackson in 1855

Member of the Minnesota Territorial Legislature
- In office 3 September 1849 – 31 December 1850

Personal details
- Born: Henry Jackson; February 1, 1811 Abingdon, Virginia, United States
- Died: July 31, 1857 (aged 46)
- Occupation: Merchant

Henry Jackson (February 1, 1811 – July 31, 1857) was an American pioneer, businessman, and politician from Minnesota.

== Biography ==
Born in Abingdon, Virginia, Jackson served in the Texas army under Sam Houston during the Texas Revolution. He moved to Green Bay, Wisconsin, then Galena, Illinois, where he opened a store. After some difficulties, he moved to Saint Paul, Minnesota and was the first merchant to settle there. He was also the first postmaster in Saint Paul and served on the Saint Paul Town Council. He was also appointed justice of the peace by Henry Dodge, Governor of Wisconsin Territory, for what is now St. Croix County, Wisconsin. From 1847 to 1848, Jackson served in the Wisconsin Territorial Legislature, serving in the Wisconsin Territorial House of Representatives, and in 1849 he was elected to the first Minnesota Territorial Legislature, serving in the Minnesota Territorial House of Representatives. In 1852, he helped found Mankato, Minnesota. Jackson County, Minnesota was named after him. He was a Democrat.
