= Fish Lake, Minnesota =

Unincorporated community in Minnesota, US

Fish Lake
- Census-designated place
- Location within Minnesota Location within the United States
- Coordinates: 43°50′19″N 95°02′49″W
- Country: United States
- State: Minnesota
- County: Jackson
- Township: Christiania

Area
  - Total: 1.25 sq mi (3.24 km^{2})
  - Land: 0.92 sq mi (2.37 km^{2})
  - Water: 0.34 sq mi (0.87 km^{2})
- Elevation: 1,427 ft (435 m)

Population (2020)
  - Total: 75
  - Density: 82/sq mi (31.7/km^{2})
- Time zone: UTC-6 (Central (CST))
  - Summer (DST): UTC-5 (CDT)
- Area code: 507
- GNIS feature ID: 2583776

Fish Lake is a census-designated place and unincorporated community in Christiania Township, Jackson County, Minnesota, United States. As of the 2020 census, Fish Lake had a population of 75. Its former name was Swastika Beach.

== Demographics ==
Historical population
Census	Pop.	Note	%±
2020	75		—
U.S. Decennial Census
