= Rost, Minnesota =

Unincorporated community in Minnesota, United States

Rost
- Unincorporated community
- Location within Minnesota Location within the United States
- Coordinates: 43°38′43″N 95°17′41″W
- Country: United States
- State: Minnesota
- County: Jackson
- Township: Rost
- Elevation: 1,437 ft (438 m)
- Time zone: UTC-6 (Central (CST))
  - Summer (DST): UTC-5 (CDT)
- GNIS feature ID: 658093

Rost' is an unincorporated community in Rost Township, Jackson County, Minnesota, United States.
