= Round Lake Township =

Round Lake Township may refer to:

- Round Lake Township, Becker County, Minnesota
- Round Lake Township, Jackson County, Minnesota
- Round Lake Township, McHenry County, North Dakota, in McHenry County, North Dakota
