= Rost (Tashkent newspaper) =

Bukharian-Jewish language newspaper

Rost ראסת
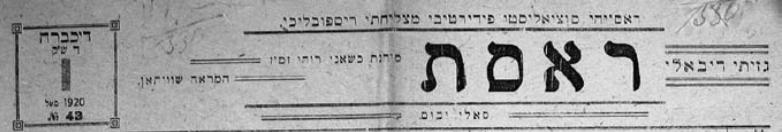
- Rost masthead, 1920
- Type: Wall newspaper
- Publisher: Turkestan Department of the Russian Telegraph Agency
- Editor: Rahmin Badalov
- Founded: 1920
- Ceased publication: 1922
- Political alignment: Communist
- Language: Judeo-Tajik ('Persian language of Local Jews')
- City: Tashkent
- Country: Soviet Russia

Rost (ראסת, English: Truth) was a Bukharian-Jewish (Judeo-Tajik) language wall newspaper-bulletin published twice weekly from Tashkent, Turkestan Autonomous Soviet Socialist Republic, between 1920 and 1922. Rost was an organ of the Turkestan Division of the Russian Telegraph Agency (ROSTA).

== Founding of Rost ==
Rost was the second Bukharian-Jewish newspaper in history, after the pre-revolutionary Raḥamim and was the first Bukharian-Jewish Soviet newspaper. Behind the launching of Rost stood Rahmin Badalov, the director of the Educational Institute (INPROS), who had set up a Bukharian-Jewish printing house. Badalov would serve as the editor of Rost.

At the time, Soviet language policy regarding the Bukharian Jews was not entirely consistent and Rost conceptualized that the newspaper was published in the 'Persian language of Local Jews', albeit other Soviet institutions at the time used terms like 'Tajik' or 'language of the Bukhara Jews'. As of December 1920, Rost carried the motto "Workers of the world, unite!" translated as מיחנת כשאני רוהי זמין המראה שוויתאן, by June 1921, the wording of the translation of the motto had changed to רנג בראני רוהי גיהאן בא הם פייבנד שוויתאן.

== Contents ==
Rost was published twice weekly. Copies of Rost consisted of a single page, carrying translated ROSTA news stories and articles from the Russian press on government activities. The newspaper used Rashi script. Copies of Rost were distributed free of charge. In 1920, 40 issues were published, but in 1921, publication became more irregular with only 13 issues published.

== Naming ==
The name of the publication was taken from the abbreviation of the Russian Telegraph Agency ROSTA. But in Hebrew writing, the final 'a' of the Russian abbreviation was omitted in print, giving the word rost which means 'truth' in Bukharian-Jewish language (which alluded to the Russian newspaper Pravda).

== Closure ==
Publication of Rost was abruptly discontinued in 1922 as its editors had been found engaging in bazaar business activities in the midst of the New Economic Policy.
