= Mordekhai Batchaev =

Bukharan Jewish poet

Mordekhai Batchaev (Hebrew: מרדכי חיא בצ'איב, 1911–2007), known by his pen-name Muhib, was a Bukharan Jewish poet.

He was born in Mari (present-day Merv, Turkmenistan). His father Khie Batchaev was the correspondent of the newspaper Raḥamim in their hometown. The family soon moved to Samarkand where Mordekhai Batchaev attended Jewish religious school and Russian secondary school. In 1927 his first poems were published in the periodical Roşnaji.

Between 1928 and 1938 he was active in Bukharan Jewish periodicals. In 1930 he became the managing secretary of the newspaper Bajroqi Miⱨnat ('Banner of Labour'). He authored collections of poems, Bahori surkh ('Red Spring', 1931), Kuvati kolektiv ('Collective strength', 1931) and Sadoyi miⱨnat ('Voice of Labour', 1932). He studied at the Faculty of Literature at the Central Asian State University in Tashkent. He was arrested on charges of bourgeois nationalism in early July 1938. He was released in 1945, but prohibited from residing in major cities. He was rehabilitated in 1953 and settled in Dushanbe. He worked as a Russian-Tajik translator from 1954 onward, and retired in 1972.

In 1973 he moved to Israel. There, he again began to participate in radio broadcasts in Bukharian and to edit a monthly bulletin in that language, where he also published his new poems. In 1974-1975 Batchaev authored a two-volume autobiographical prose work, titled Dar Juvoli Sangin ('In a Stone Sack'). He died in 2007 in Petah Tikva. In 2007 the collected works of Batchaev, in seven volumes, were published.
