= Bajroqi Miⱨnat =

Bukharian Jewish newspaper (1925–1938)

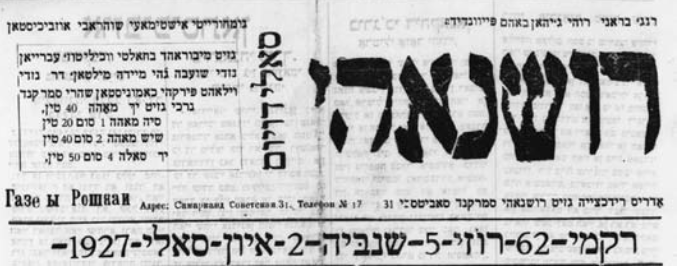
Roşnaji masthead, 1927

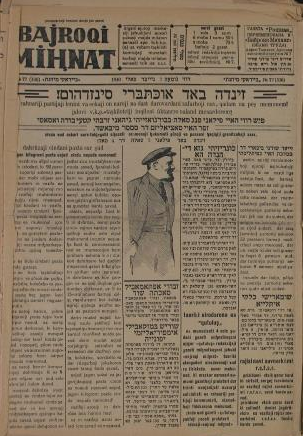
Bajroqi Miⱨnat, issue of November 7, 1930 (anniversary of the October Revolution), with articles in the Hebrew script

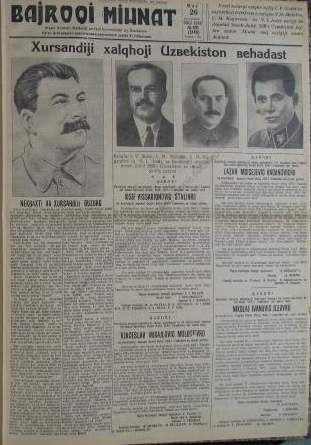
Bajroqi Miⱨnat, issue of May 26, 1938, in the Latin script

Bajroqi Miⱨnat (lit. 'Banner of Labour'), initially known as Roşnaji (רושנאהי, lit. 'Enlightenment'), was a Bukharian Jewish newspaper published in Samarkand from 1925 to 1930, and in Tashkent from 1930 to 1938.

== Roşnaji (1925–1930) ==
On November 16, 1925, the first issue of the lithographed publication Roşnaji ('Enlightenment') began publishing from Samarkand. In the initial period, Roşnaji had a very limited readership, with just 150-200 copies of each issue being printed by hand and distributed within the Jewish quarter of the city. Haim Kalantrov headed the publication during its early phase. Ilevumani Pinkasov was the first editor of the publication. In 1926, the newspaper became an organ of the Jewish Section of the Communist Party. Menashe Aminov became the editor of Roşnaji in 1927. The Roşnaji readership gradually grew, reaching 700 copies per issue within a two-year span. In 1928, Roşnaji began switching to Latin script. With the somewhat more stable readership Roşnaji was able to afford to shift to mechanical printing, whereby the circulation increased to 1,000 copies. Half a year later, the print doubled to 2,000 copies. In June 1929, Aharon Saidov, returning from studies at the Communist University of the Toilers of the East in Moscow, was named editor-in-chief of the newspaper.

== Bajroqi Miⱨnat (1930–1938) ==
In April 1930, the editorial office of the publication was moved to Tashkent and the newspaper was renamed Bajroqi Miⱨnat ('Banner of Labour'). The earlier name was deemed insufficiently "Soviet" in character. The editorial office and printing house were installed in the former synagogue in downtown Tashkent. On April 8, 1931, the newspaper became an organ of the Central Bureau of the Bukharan Jewish Sections of the Central Committee of the Communist Party of Uzbekistan and the Organizational Commission on National Minorities of the Central Executive Committee of the Uzbek SSR. Mordekhai Batchaev (Muhib) was the executive secretary of the publication.

The newspaper continued to carry articles printed in the Hebraic Rashi script until 1932, in spite of instructions from the Uzbek SSR government to switch fully to Latin script. When it did switch to Latin script, it initially avoided the use of Latin capital letters as per Jewish writing rules.

The newspaper contained news stories translated from Russian language press, news from Bukharan Jewish community life (at one point Bajroqi Miⱨnat had some 380 local correspondents) and a literary supplement. As of 1932-1933, circulation reached its peak at around 7,000 (which considering that the Bukharan Jewish community in its totality numbered about 20,000 individuals, implying that most Bukharan Jewish households subscribed to the newspaper). By this point, the newspaper was distributed among Bukharan Jewish communities across Central Asia. In 1933, it became a daily newspaper.

By 1935, circulation had dropped to about 5,000 copies per issue. In its later phase, the newspaper stopped using the term 'Bukharan Jews', changing to 'Central Asian Jews'.

Yunatan Kurayev was named as the chief editor of Bajroqi Miⱨnat in 1938, shortly before the closure of the newspaper. Publishing of Bajroqi Miⱨnat was discontinued in the midst of the Great Terror in June 1938. Aminov, Pinkasov and Kalantrov suffered repression, and on June 6, 1938, Saidov was arrested. Batchaev was arrested in early July 1938.
