= Raḥamim (newspaper) =

Bukharian language newspaper

Raḥamim רַחֲמִים
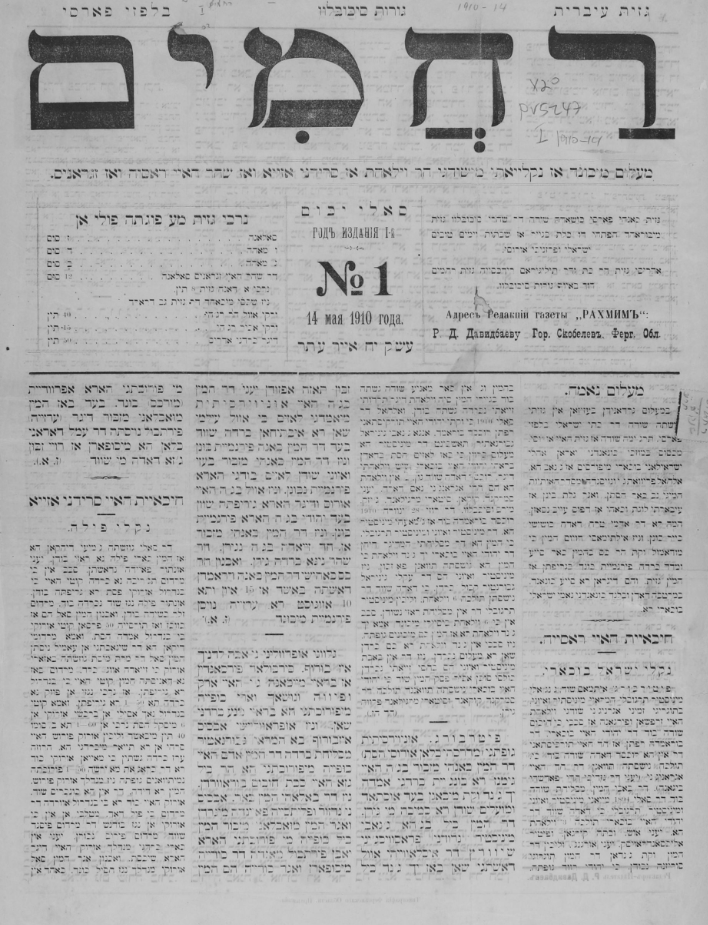
- The first issue of Raḥamim published in 1910
- Founder(s): Rahamim Davidbayev
- Editor: Nisim Tadzhir, Rafael Galibov
- Founded: May 27, 1910
- Language: Judeo-Tajik
- Ceased publication: 1916
- City: Skobelev (1910–1913), Kokand (1913–1916)
- Country: Russia

Raḥamim (רַחֲמִים, 'mercy'), also known as Rakhamim, was a Bukharian (Judeo-Tajik) language weekly newspaper published from Skobelev (present-day Fergana in Uzbekistan) between 1910 and 1913, and from Kokand (Turkestan Krai) between 1913 and 1916. It was the first newspaper published in Judeo-Tajik and it was printed in Rashi script.

== History ==
The founder of the newspaper was Rahamim Davidbayev, a wealthy businessman in the Skobolev. He brought costly printing equipment from Lublin at his own expense in order to launch the newspaper. The name of the newspaper alluded to the name of its founder. The first issue came out on May 27 [O.S. May 14] 1910. Raḥamim was distributed among Bukharian Jewish communities in cities across Central Asia. It was the first newspaper published in Judeo-Tajik: a Judeo-Persian dialect. It was printed in Rashi script: a 15th-century Sephardic semi-cursive handwriting. The weekly newspaper was published from Skobelev (present-day Fergana in Uzbekistan) between 1910 and 1913, and from Kokand (Turkestan Krai) between 1913 and 1916.

Issues of the newspaper contained two or four pages. The newspaper consisted mainly of correspondent telegrams. Local news stories as well as reporting on world events were translated from Russian language. Hitherto Judeo-Tajik had not been used much as a written language, and the newspaper frequently employed Russian loanwords to fill gaps in vocabulary. Raḥamim also covered Jewish community affairs to some extent, including both private and official correspondence. There were translations from Hebrew of works from the Haskalah movement by Eastern Jewish publicists. The publication sometimes carried religious and fictional stories. The newspaper would carry adverts for local businesses, train schedules and a financial supplement with foreign currency exchange rates.

Davidbayev recruited a number of gifted young men to work on the publication and the editorial office of Raḥamim soon became a hub for Bukharian Jewish intellectual life. The staff included Nisim Tadzhir, Rafael Galibov (writer and translator), rabbi Shlomo ben Pinkhas Babadzhan and Mulla Azare Yusupov. Tadzhir and Galibov served as the editors of the newspaper. Khie Batchaev (father of the poet Muhib) was the correspondent of Raḥamim in Mari.

The last issue published from Skobelev was dated January 9, 1913 [O.S. December 27]. The newspaper reappeared, published from Kokand on June 26, 1913. Per secondary sources publication of Raḥamim continued from Kokand from 1914 to 1916, albeit sporadically.
