= Heron Lake (Jackson County, Minnesota) =

Lake in the state of Minnesota, United States

- Location within Minnesota
- Location: Jackson County, Minnesota
- Coordinates: 43°46′27″N 95°16′9″W
- Type: lake
- Etymology: Named after Black-Crowned Night Heron
- Primary inflows: Jack Creek, Okabena Creek
- Primary outflows: Heron Lake Outlet
- Catchment area: 444 square miles (1,150 km^{2})
- Max. length: 11.5 miles (18.5 km)
- Max. width: 2.5 miles (4.0 km)
- Surface area: 7,997 acres (3,236 ha)
- Average depth: 2.9 feet (0.88 m)
- Max. depth: 6.5 feet (2.0 m)
- Shore length^{1}: 66 miles (106 km)
- References: https://files.dnr.state.mn.us/fish_wildlife/habitat/aquatic/shallowlakes/heronlake-mp.pdf
- ^{1} Shore length is not a well-defined measure.

Heron Lake is a lake in Jackson County, in the U.S. state of Minnesota.

Heron Lake is the English translation of the native Dakota language name, Okabena, meaning place where the heron nest.

The lake is divided into four sub-basins named: Duck Lake, North Marsh, North Heron, and South Heron. A channel named Division Creek connects South Heron to North Heron. Each sub-basin has unique characteristics and differing substrates.

The outlet for the Heron Lake basin is currently controlled by the State Dam that is managed by the Minnesota Department of Natural Resources (MnDNR). However, the downstream channel size controls outflow during high water events.

== History ==
Heron Lake has a long history as an important resting area for migratory waterfowl and had sustained Native American communities for thousands of years. At the turn of the 20th century, this bounty was then exploited by unregulated market hunters who could bag thousands of ducks per day. As these important wildlife resources declined and markets changed, settlers became more dependent on agriculture. As this agricultural use intensified, 90% of the wetlands and 99% of the prairie was converted to farmland. This has led to water quality issues since the 1950s and has greatly impacted wildlife numbers due to the loss of important submerged aquatic vegetation and habitat.

== Conservation Work ==
However, due to this rich history, work to improve the water quality and wildlife habitat of Heron Lake has increased throughout the watershed in recent decades. Multiple conservation organizations have completed projects in the watershed including the MnDNR, USFWS, Pheasants Forever, The Nature Conservancy, Minnesota Land Trust, Ducks Unlimited, Delta Waterfowl, and the North Heron Lake Game Producers.

Heron Lake, with the exclusion of Duck Lake, has been designated as a state Wildlife Lake since 1973. This designation gives the MnDNR the authority to manage the lake for wildlife habitat and temporarily draw down the lake level to promote vegetative growth. Watercraft use is also restricted during the sensitive waterfowl nesting season.

== See also ==
- List of lakes in Minnesota
