= Minneota Township, Jackson County, Minnesota =

Minneota Township, Minnesota
- Township
- Location within the state of Minnesota Minneota Township, Minnesota (the United States)
- Coordinates: 43°32′20″N 95°8′57″W
- Country: United States
- State: Minnesota
- County: Jackson

Area
  - Total: 36.2 sq mi (93.8 km^{2})
  - Land: 33.6 sq mi (87.0 km^{2})
  - Water: 2.6 sq mi (6.8 km^{2})
- Elevation: 1,440 ft (439 m)

Population (2000)
  - Total: 285
  - Density: 8.5/sq mi (3.3/km^{2})
- Time zone: UTC-6 (Central (CST))
  - Summer (DST): UTC-5 (CDT)
- FIPS code: 27-43108
- GNIS feature ID: 0664990

Minneota Township is a township in Jackson County, Minnesota, United States. The population was 285 at the 2000 census.

Minneota Township was organized in 1866, and derives its name from the Dakota language word meaning "much water".

== Geography ==
According to the United States Census Bureau, the township has a total area of 36.2 square miles (93.8 km^{2}), of which 33.6 square miles (87.0 km^{2}) is land and 2.6 square miles (6.8 km^{2}) (7.29%) is water.

== Demographics ==
As of the census of 2000, there were 285 people, 115 households, and 84 families residing in the township. The population density was 8.5 people per square mile (3.3/km^{2}). There were 142 housing units at an average density of 4.2/sq mi (1.6/km^{2}). The racial makeup of the township was 99.65% White and 0.35% Asian.

There were 115 households, out of which 27.0% had children under the age of 18 living with them, 71.3% were married couples living together, 1.7% had a female householder with no husband present, and 26.1% were non-families. 24.3% of all households were made up of individuals, and 7.8% had someone living alone who was 65 years of age or older. The average household size was 2.48 and the average family size was 2.94.

In the township the population was spread out, with 24.9% under the age of 18, 6.3% from 18 to 24, 24.6% from 25 to 44, 29.8% from 45 to 64, and 14.4% who were 65 years of age or older. The median age was 42 years. For every 100 females, there were 103.6 males. For every 100 females age 18 and over, there were 111.9 males.

The median income for a household in the township was $42,969, and the median income for a family was $44,531. Males had a median income of $29,792 versus $19,063 for females. The per capita income for the township was $15,071. About 8.0% of families and 9.1% of the population were below the poverty line, including 12.5% of those under the age of eighteen and 6.7% of those 65 or over.
