= Jackson County, Minnesota =

County in Minnesota

- County
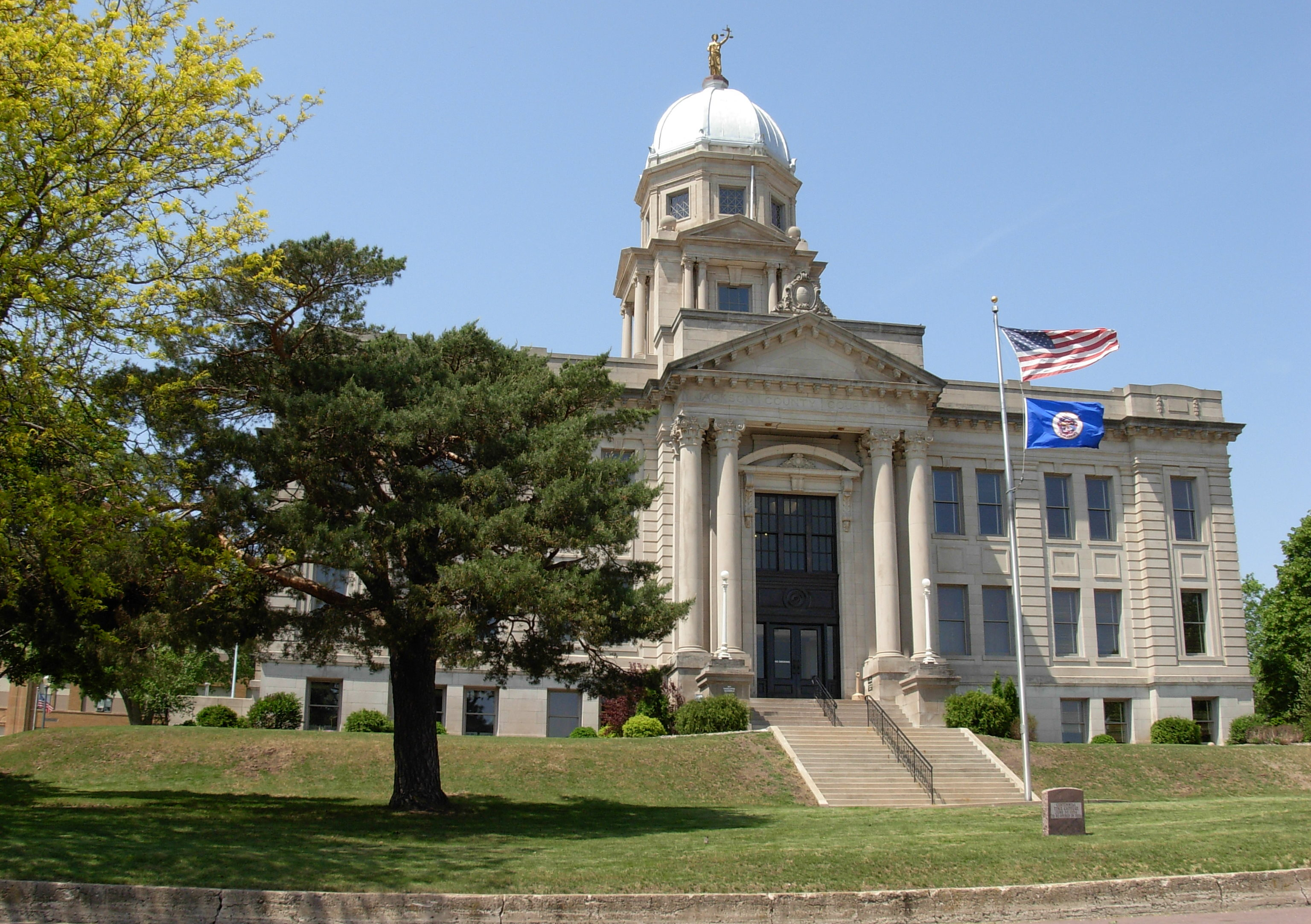
- Jackson County Courthouse in Jackson

- Location within the U.S. state of Minnesota
- Coordinates: 43°41′N 95°10′W
- Country: United States
- State: Minnesota
- Founded: May 23, 1857
- Named for: Henry Jackson
- Seat: Jackson
- Largest city: Jackson

Area
  - Total: 719 sq mi (1,860 km^{2})
  - Land: 703 sq mi (1,820 km^{2})
  - Water: 16 sq mi (41 km^{2}) 2.3%

Population (2020)
  - Total: 9,989
  - Estimate (2025): 9,857 ▼
  - Density: 14.2/sq mi (5.49/km^{2})
- Time zone: UTC−6 (Central)
  - Summer (DST): UTC−5 (CDT)
- Congressional district: 1st
- Website: jacksoncountymn.gov

Jackson County is a county in the U.S. state of Minnesota. As of the 2020 census, the population was 9,989. Its county seat is Jackson.

== History ==
The county was created on May 23, 1857. It was named for Henry Jackson, the first merchant in St. Paul.

== Geography ==
Jackson County is on Minnesota's border with Iowa. The Des Moines River flows south-southeasterly through the central part of the county, then into Iowa. The county terrain is hilly and carved with drainages and gullies. The area is devoted to agriculture. The terrain generally slopes to the south and east; its highest point is on the lower west border, at 1,545 ft (471 m) ASL. The county has a total area of 719 square miles (1,860 km^{2}), of which 703 square miles (1,820 km^{2}) is land and 16 square miles (41 km^{2}) (2.3%) is water.

Soils of Jackson County

=== Lakes ===
- Andersons Marsh
- Bennett Slough (Partially Drained)
- Boot Lake
- Chandler Lake
- Clear Lake (part)
- Clear Lake (Des Moines Township and Hunter Township)
- Fish Lake (part)
- Grovers Lake (part)
- Heron Lake (4 basins: Duck, North Marsh, North Lake, South Lake, connected by streams)
- Illinois Lake
- Independence Lake
- Iowa Lake (part)
- Lake Flaherty
- Laurs Lake
- Little Spirit Lake (part)
- Long Lake (Drained CD13)
- Loon Lake
- Pearl Lake
- Quevli and Goose Slough (Drained JD3)
- Quelvis Lake (Drained)
- Round Lake
- Rush Lake (Sioux Valley Township)
- Rush Lake (Minneota Township)
- Skunk Lake
- Spirit Lake
- String Lake (part)
- Swenson Lake (Drained)
- Teal Lake
- Timber Lake

=== Protected areas ===
Sources:

- Anderson County Park
- Artz WMA
- Belmont County Park
- Bootleg Lake State Wildlife Management Area
- Brown County Park
- Caraway State Wildlife Management Area
- Christiana WPA
- Clear Lake Recreation Area
- Community Point County Park
- Cotton-Jack WMA
- Dead Horse WMA
- Des Moines River Scientific and Natural Area
- Fish Lake WPA
- Graham Creek WMA
- Heron Lake WMA
- Heron Meadows WMA
- Holthe Prairie Scientific and Natural Area
- Holy Trinity WPA
- Husen Wildlife Management Area
- Kilen Woods State Park
- Laurs Lake State Wildlife Management Area
- Lillegard WMA
- Little Sioux WMA
- Minnesota Slough State Wildlife Management Area
- Oxbow WMA
- Pietz Slough WMA
- Robertson County Park
- Rost WPA
- Sandy Point County Park
- Sangl State Wildlife Management Area
- Sioux Forks WPA
- Sioux Valley WMA
- Skunk Lake WMA
- String Lake WPA
- Summers State Wildlife Management Area
- Teal Lake WMA
- Timber Lake WMA
- Timber Lake WPA
- Toe WMA
- Valleau WMA
- Winkler WMA

=== Major highways ===
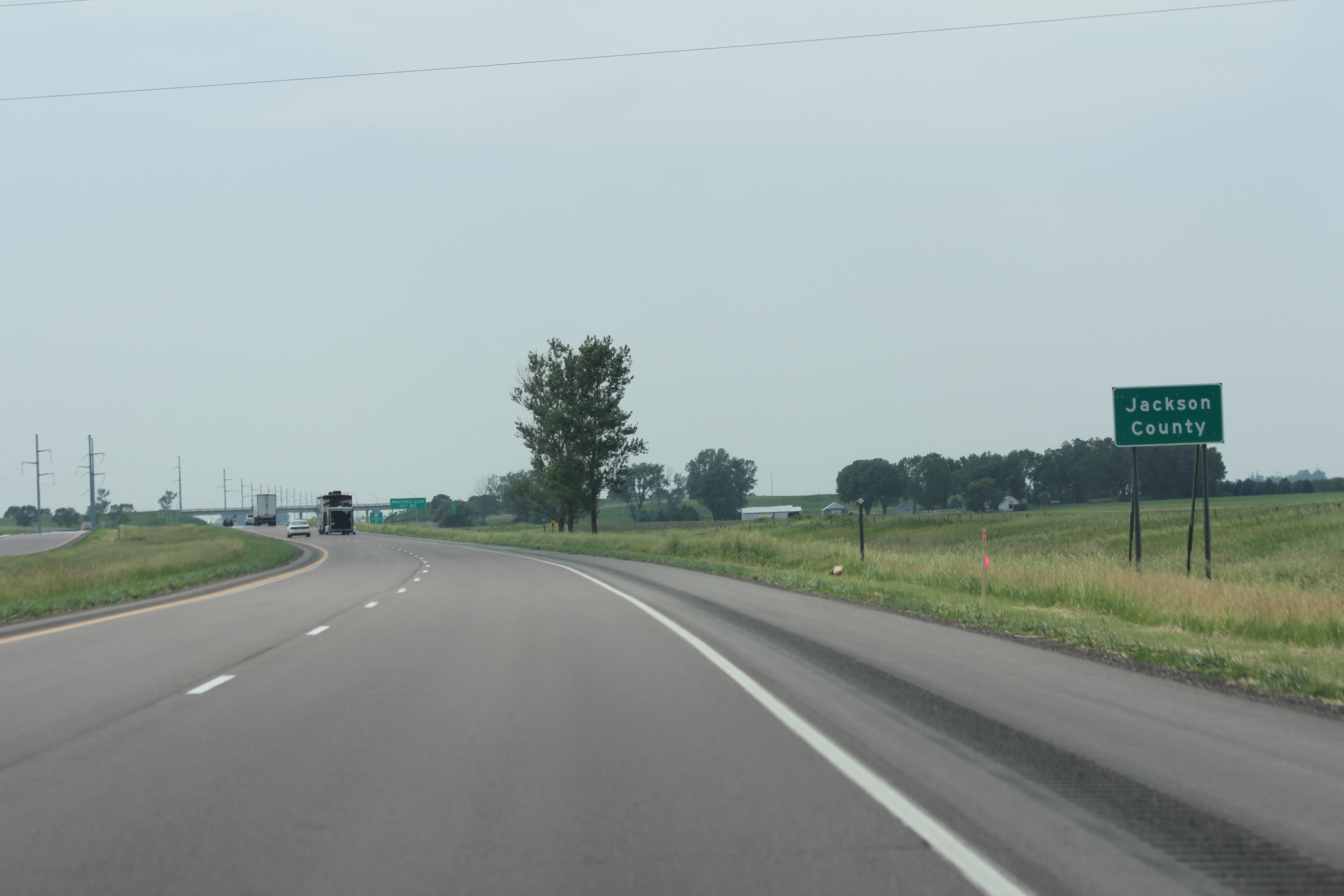
Jackson County sign on I90

- Interstate 90
- U.S. Highway 71
- Minnesota State Highway 60
- Minnesota State Highway 86
- Minnesota State Highway 264

=== Adjacent counties ===
- Cottonwood County - north
- Watonwan County - northeast
- Martin County - east
- Emmet County, Iowa - southeast
- Dickinson County, Iowa - south
- Osceola County, Iowa - southwest
- Nobles County - west

== Demographics ==
Historical population
Census	Pop.	Note	%±
1860	181		—
1870	1,825		908.3%
1880	4,806		163.3%
1890	8,924		85.7%
1900	14,793		65.8%
1910	14,491		−2.0%
1920	15,955		10.1%
1930	15,863		−0.6%
1940	16,805		5.9%
1950	16,306		−3.0%
1960	15,501		−4.9%
1970	14,352		−7.4%
1980	13,690		−4.6%
1990	11,677		−14.7%
2000	11,268		−3.5%
2010	10,266		−8.9%
2020	9,989		−2.7%
2025 (est.)	9,857	▼	−1.3%
U.S. Decennial Census; 1790–1960 1900–1990; 1990–2000 2010–2020

=== 2020 census ===
As of the 2020 census, the county had a population of 9,989. The median age was 43.4 years. 22.7% of residents were under the age of 18 and 21.9% of residents were 65 years of age or older. For every 100 females there were 104.4 males, and for every 100 females age 18 and over there were 104.2 males age 18 and over.

The racial makeup of the county was 91.4% White, 1.2% Black or African American, 0.3% American Indian and Alaska Native, 1.2% Asian, <0.1% Native Hawaiian and Pacific Islander, 2.0% from some other race, and 3.9% from two or more races. Hispanic or Latino residents of any race comprised 4.0% of the population.

<0.1% of residents lived in urban areas, while 100.0% lived in rural areas.

There were 4,307 households in the county, of which 26.8% had children under the age of 18 living in them. Of all households, 49.9% were married-couple households, 21.6% were households with a male householder and no spouse or partner present, and 21.8% were households with a female householder and no spouse or partner present. About 32.1% of all households were made up of individuals and 15.4% had someone living alone who was 65 years of age or older.

There were 4,891 housing units, of which 11.9% were vacant. Among occupied housing units, 78.2% were owner-occupied and 21.8% were renter-occupied. The homeowner vacancy rate was 1.5% and the rental vacancy rate was 10.7%.

=== Racial and ethnic composition ===
Jackson County, Minnesota – Racial and ethnic composition Note: the US Census treats Hispanic/Latino as an ethnic category. This table excludes Latinos from the racial categories and assigns them to a separate category. Hispanics/Latinos may be of any race.
Race / Ethnicity (NH = Non-Hispanic)	Pop 1980	Pop 1990	Pop 2000	Pop 2010	Pop 2020	% 1980	% 1990	% 2000	% 2010	% 2020
White alone (NH)	13,603	11,387	10,839	9,701	9,026	99.36%	97.52%	96.19%	94.50%	90.36%
Black or African American alone (NH)	3	2	10	47	120	0.02%	0.02%	0.09%	0.46%	1.20%
Native American or Alaska Native alone (NH)	5	15	13	15	22	0.04%	0.13%	0.12%	0.15%	0.22%
Asian alone (NH)	32	160	155	136	122	0.23%	1.37%	1.38%	1.32%	1.22%
Native Hawaiian or Pacific Islander alone (NH)	x	x	0	0	0	x	x	0.00%	0.00%	0.00%
Other race alone (NH)	14	0	5	5	23	0.10%	0.00%	0.04%	0.05%	0.23%
Mixed race or Multiracial (NH)	x	x	36	85	275	x	x	0.32%	0.83%	2.75%
Hispanic or Latino (any race)	33	113	210	277	401	0.24%	0.97%	1.86%	2.70%	4.01%
Total	13,690	11,677	11,268	10,266	9,989	100.00%	100.00%	100.00%	100.00%	100.00%

=== 2000 census ===
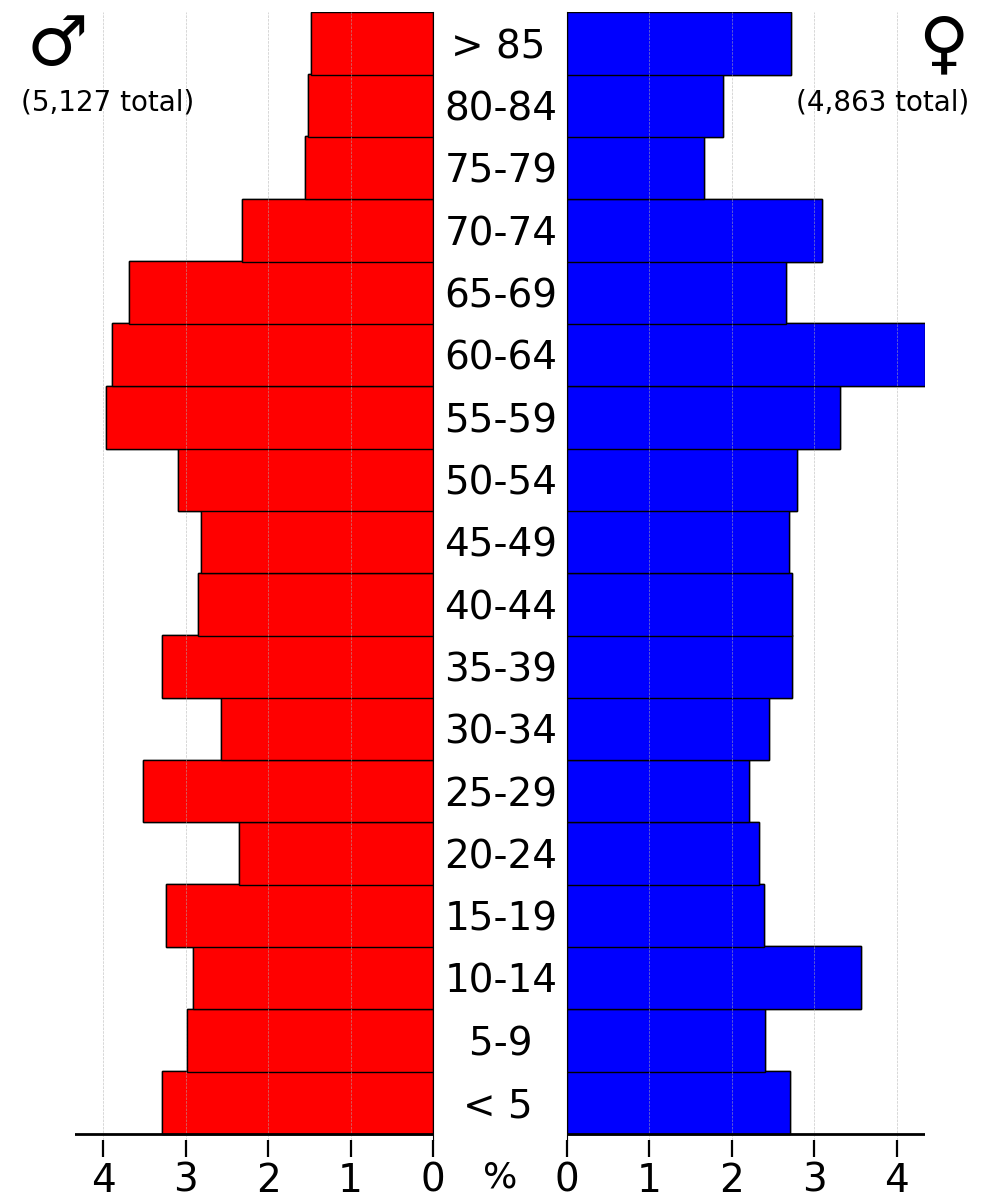
2022 US Census population pyramid for Jackson County, from ACS 5-year estimates

As of the census of 2000, there were 11,268 people, 4,556 households, and 3,116 families in the county. The population density was 16.0 per square mile (6.2/km^{2}). There were 5,092 housing units at an average density of 7.24 per square mile (2.80/km^{2}). The racial makeup of the county was 97.07% White, 0.09% Black or African American, 0.12% Native American, 1.38% Asian, 0.97% from other races, and 0.38% from two or more races. 1.86% of the population were Hispanic or Latino of any race. 51.9% were of German, 14.1% Norwegian and 5.6% American ancestry.

There were 4,556 households, out of which 29.80% had children under the age of 18 living with them, 60.00% were married couples living together, 5.40% had a female householder with no husband present, and 31.60% were non-families. 28.50% of all households were made up of individuals, and 13.40% had someone living alone who was 65 years of age or older. The average household size was 2.40 and the average family size was 2.95.

The county population contained 24.50% under the age of 18, 7.00% from 18 to 24, 25.30% from 25 to 44, 22.60% from 45 to 64, and 20.50% who were 65 years of age or older. The median age was 41 years. For every 100 females there were 100.60 males. For every 100 females age 18 and over, there were 99.30 males.

The median income for a household in the county was $36,746, and the median income for a family was $43,426. Males had a median income of $29,123 versus $20,860 for females. The per capita income for the county was $17,499. About 5.20% of families and 8.60% of the population were below the poverty line, including 11.00% of those under age 18 and 8.40% of those age 65 or over.

== Communities ==
=== Cities ===
- Alpha
- Heron Lake
- Jackson (county seat)
- Lakefield
- Okabena
- Wilder

=== Census-designated place ===
- Fish Lake

=== Unincorporated communities ===
- Bergen
- Miloma
- Petersburg
- Rost
- Sioux Valley
- Spafford

=== Townships ===
- Alba Township
- Belmont Township
- Christiania Township
- Delafield Township
- Des Moines Township
- Enterprise Township
- Ewington Township
- Heron Lake Township
- Hunter Township
- Kimball Township
- La Crosse Township
- Middletown Township
- Minneota Township
- Petersburg Township
- Rost Township
- Round Lake Township
- Sioux Valley Township
- Weimer Township
- West Heron Lake Township
- Wisconsin Township

== Politics ==
From 1932 to 1996, Jackson County favored the Democratic nominee in all but four presidential elections, all of which were Republican landslides. Since 2000, the county has voted Republican in every election. George W. Bush won the county by somewhat modest margins in both 2000 and 2004, and John McCain defeated Barack Obama by slightly over 4% in 2008. In 2012, Mitt Romney defeated Obama by over 14%. This was a portent, as in 2016, Donald Trump nearly tripled Romney's margin of victory, defeating Hillary Clinton in the county by over 38%. Trump was the first Republican to win at least 60% of the county vote since Dwight D. Eisenhower in 1952. His margin of victory fell slightly in 2020, but he increased his vote share to nearly 68%, the best vote share for any Republican in the county since Warren G. Harding. Trump's vote share increased further to nearly 70% in 2024 and his margin of victory increased to 42%, the highest for a Republican presidential candidate since Harding in 1920.

United States presidential election results for Jackson County, Minnesota
Year	Republican		Democratic		Third party(ies)	
Year	No.	%	No.	%	No.	%
1892	901	46.16%	721	36.94%	330	16.91%
1896	1,558	56.51%	1,150	41.71%	49	1.78%
1900	1,757	61.35%	993	34.67%	114	3.98%
1904	2,032	76.08%	554	20.74%	85	3.18%
1908	1,575	58.94%	1,013	37.91%	84	3.14%
1912	468	17.14%	913	33.43%	1,350	49.43%
1916	1,503	51.95%	1,272	43.97%	118	4.08%
1920	4,313	83.62%	715	13.86%	130	2.52%
1924	2,760	48.96%	407	7.22%	2,470	43.82%
1928	3,099	55.06%	2,503	44.47%	26	0.46%
1932	1,524	26.45%	4,129	71.67%	108	1.87%
1936	1,676	23.29%	5,187	72.09%	332	4.61%
1940	3,387	45.27%	4,065	54.33%	30	0.40%
1944	2,789	44.77%	3,417	54.85%	24	0.39%
1948	2,288	32.83%	4,541	65.16%	140	2.01%
1952	4,558	62.08%	2,771	37.74%	13	0.18%
1956	3,543	52.23%	3,232	47.64%	9	0.13%
1960	3,591	47.87%	3,898	51.96%	13	0.17%
1964	2,441	34.77%	4,576	65.18%	4	0.06%
1968	2,886	42.65%	3,515	51.95%	365	5.39%
1972	3,599	51.50%	3,304	47.27%	86	1.23%
1976	2,870	39.39%	4,311	59.16%	106	1.45%
1980	3,391	48.00%	3,062	43.35%	611	8.65%
1984	3,131	47.27%	3,437	51.89%	55	0.83%
1988	2,629	44.12%	3,275	54.96%	55	0.92%
1992	1,824	29.17%	2,481	39.68%	1,947	31.14%
1996	2,153	36.87%	2,727	46.70%	959	16.42%
2000	2,773	50.99%	2,364	43.47%	301	5.54%
2004	3,024	52.33%	2,652	45.89%	103	1.78%
2008	2,858	50.83%	2,618	46.56%	147	2.61%
2012	3,044	56.06%	2,268	41.77%	118	2.17%
2016	3,609	65.81%	1,492	27.21%	383	6.98%
2020	3,948	67.85%	1,745	29.99%	126	2.17%
2024	3,949	69.97%	1,581	28.01%	114	2.02%

== See also ==
- National Register of Historic Places listings in Jackson County, Minnesota
