= Bill Weber (Minnesota politician) =

American politician

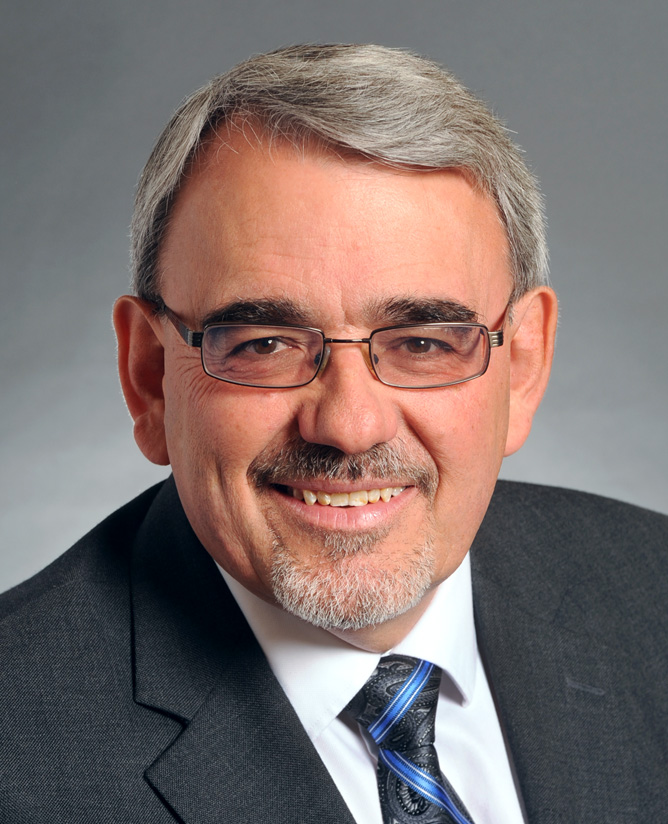

Member of the Minnesota Senate from the 21st district
- Incumbent
- Assumed office January 8, 2013
- Preceded by: Doug Magnus

Personal details
- Born: April 3, 1956 (age 70)
- Party: Republican
- Spouse: Barb
- Children: 2
- Education: Nettleton Business College
- Occupation: Real estate broker

William Weber (born April 3, 1956) is an American politician and Republican member of the Minnesota Senate. He represents District 21, which includes all or parts of Cottonwood, Jackson, Lincoln, Lyon, Murray, Nobles, Pipestone, Redwood, and Rock Counties in the southwestern part of the state.

== Early life, education, and family ==
Weber was raised in Rock County, Minnesota. He graduated from Luverne High School and attended the now defunct Nettleton Business College, graduating with a degree in professional accounting. He served on the Luverne City Council from 1984 to 1992, and was the city's mayor from 1992 to 2001. A licensed real estate broker, he and his wife, Barb, continue to reside in Luverne, and have two adult children. He is a Lutheran.

== Minnesota Senate ==
Weber first ran for the Minnesota Senate in 2006, losing to longtime Democratic incumbent Jim Vickerman. In 2012, after incumbent Republican Senator Doug Magnus announced he would not seek reelection, he ran again and was elected. He was reelected in 2016 and 2020.

Weber serves as chair of the Senate's Agriculture, Rural Development, and Housing Policy Committee, as vice chair of the Environment and Natural Resources Policy and Legacy Finance Committee, and as a member of the Agriculture, Rural Development, and Housing Finance Committee and the Environment and Natural Resources Finance Committee.

== Political views ==
Weber has opposed penalties for property owners who do not maintain vegetative buffers around water.

When asked about police brutality following the murder of George Floyd, Weber said mistakes were "made in terms of George Floyd's arrest and how he was treated afterward." He also condemned rioting and the burning of police precincts, saying there was "no excuse for that type of violence."
