= Doug Magnus =

American politician

Member of the Minnesota Senate from the 22nd district
- In office January 3, 2011 – January 8, 2013
- Preceded by: Jim Vickerman
- Succeeded by: Bill Weber

Member of the Minnesota House of Representatives from the 22A district
- In office January 7, 2003 – January 3, 2011
- Preceded by: Ted Winter
- Succeeded by: Joe Schomacker

Personal details
- Born: November 1950 (age 75)
- Party: Republican
- Spouse: Brenda
- Children: 2
- Education: South Dakota State University
- Profession: Farmer, legislator

Douglas Rudy Magnus (born November 1950) is an American, Minnesota politician and a former member of the Minnesota Senate, who represented District 22, which includes all of Cottonwood, Jackson, Murray, Nobles, Pipestone and Rock counties in the southwestern part of the state. A Republican, he is also a farmer.

Magnus previously served in the Minnesota House of Representatives from 2003–2011, representing District 22A, which essentially includes the western half of the senate district. On April 6, 2010, he announced that he would not seek a fifth term in the House, but would run for the Senate seat being vacated by retiring Senator Jim Vickerman. He subsequently won that seat in the November 2, 2010, general election. On November 17, 2010, incoming Republican Senate Majority Leader Amy Koch announced that he would serve as an assistant majority leader and as chairman of the Senate Agriculture Committee during the 2011–2012 biennium.

On March 5, 2012, Magnus announced that he would not seek re-election to the Senate in the November 2012 general election. His term ended on January 7, 2013.

Magnus attended Slayton High School in Slayton, later graduating from South Dakota State University in Brookings with a BS in Animal Science. He served in the United States Army during the Vietnam War from 1970–1972.
