= Rod Hamilton =

American politician

Member of the Minnesota House of Representatives from the 22B district
- Incumbent
- Assumed office January 4, 2005
- Preceded by: Elaine Harder

Personal details
- Born: March 25, 1968 (age 58) Humboldt, Iowa, U.S.
- Party: Republican
- Spouse: Lynee
- Children: 2
- Occupation: Pork producer, legislator

Rodney W. Hamilton (born March 25, 1968) is an American politician and former member of the Minnesota House of Representatives. A member of the Republican Party of Minnesota, he represented District 22B, which includes all or portions of Cottonwood, Jackson, Nobles and Redwood counties in the southwestern part of the state. He is also a local pork producer.

== Early life, education, and career ==
Hamilton graduated from Humboldt High School in Humboldt, Iowa. He is a former president of the Minnesota Pork Producers.

== Minnesota House of Representatives ==
Hamilton was first elected to the House in 2004, and was re-elected in 2006, 2008, 2010, 2012, 2014, 2016 and 2018. He was a minority whip during the 2009 legislative session, and was an assistant minority leader during the 2010 session.

On November 17, 2010, incoming Republican Speaker of the House Kurt Zellers announced that Hamilton would serve as chairman of the House Agriculture Committee during the 2011–2012 biennium. On November 30, 2010, he was named majority whip by his House Republican colleagues.

In 2014, he was again elected to the Minnesota House of Representatives. Rep. Rod Hamilton, R-Mountain Lake, will chair the House Agriculture Finance Committee.
