= 1914 Minnesota Senate election =

- November 3, 1914

All 67 seats in the Minnesota Senate 34 seats needed for a majority
	Majority party
Party	Nonpartisan
Last election	0
Seats won	67
Seat change	▲67
Popular vote	100.00%

The 1914 Minnesota Senate election was held on November 3, 1914, and was the first election following a 1913 law which made the Minnesota Legislature become Nonpartisan. This election also saw the addition of four seats to the senate, increasing its membership from 63 to 67 seats. Prior to the election 40 seats were held by Republicans, 20 were held by Democrats, 1 by a Prohibitionist, 1 by a Populist and 1 by an independent. Primary elections were held on June 16, 1914. Following the general election, the Senate was completely composed of Nonpartisan members.

== Incumbents defeated ==
1. District 2: Mathew J. McGrath lost re-election to Samuel M. Knopp.
2. District 3: Lytle O. Cooke lost re-election to James A. Carley.
3. District 10: Andrew C. Olson lost re-election to Charles W. Gillam.
4. District 11: Salathiel B. Bedford lost re-election to Samuel B. Nelson.
5. District 27: George C. Carpenter lost re-election to John T. Alley.
6. District 28: Napoleon A. L'Herault lost re-election to Jeremiah G. Callahan.
7. District 53: Charles D. Johnson lost re-election to George H. Gardner.
8. District 58: Thomas M. Pugh lost re-election to Richard T. Jones.
9. District 66: John Saugstad lost re-election to Richard Thompson Buckler.
10. District 67: Bengt E. Sundberg lost re-election to Nels S. Hegnes.

== Results ==
Summary of the November 3, 1914 Minnesota Senate election results
Party	Candidates	Votes	Seats	
Party	Candidates	Votes	No.	%
Nonpartisan	123		67	100.00
Total	123		67	100.00
Source: Minnesota Secretary of State

=== District 1 ===
Minnesota's 1st State Senate district election, 1914
Party	Candidate	Votes	%
Nonpartisan	Francis A. Duxbury (incumbent)	3,465	52.52%
Nonpartisan	Samuel A. Nelson	3,133	47.48%
Total votes		6,598	100.0%
Nonpartisan hold			

=== District 2 ===
Minnesota's 2nd State Senate district election, 1914
Party	Candidate	Votes	%
Nonpartisan	Samuel M. Knopp	3,247	53.60%
Nonpartisan	Mathew J. McGrath (incumbent)	2,811	46.40%
Total votes		6,058	100.0%
Nonpartisan gain from Nonpartisan			

=== District 3 ===
Minnesota's 3rd State Senate district election, 1914
Party	Candidate	Votes	%
Nonpartisan	James A. Carley	2,641	69.81%
Nonpartisan	Lytle O. Cooke (incumbent)	1,142	30.19%
Total votes		3,783	100.0%
Nonpartisan gain from Nonpartisan			

=== District 4 ===
Minnesota's 4th State Senate district election, 1914
Party	Candidate	Votes	%
Nonpartisan	James I. Vermilya	2,253	52.69%
Nonpartisan	James Kelly	2,023	47.31%
Total votes		4,276	100.0%
Nonpartisan hold			

=== District 5 ===
Minnesota's 5th State Senate district election, 1914
Party	Candidate	Votes	%
Nonpartisan	Alex S. Campbell	2,998	50.33%
Nonpartisan	Ralph E. Crane	2,959	49.67%
Total votes		5,957	100.0%
Nonpartisan hold			

=== District 6 ===
Minnesota's 6th State Senate district election, 1914
Party	Candidate	Votes	%
Nonpartisan	Carl L. Swenson	2,139	54.00%
Nonpartisan	Henry H. Emmons	1,822	46.00%
Total votes		3,961	100.0%
Nonpartisan hold			

=== District 7 ===
Minnesota's 7th State Senate district election, 1914
Party	Candidate	Votes	%
Nonpartisan	Frank E. Putnam (incumbent)	2,888	100.0%
Total votes		2,888	100.0%
Nonpartisan hold			

=== District 8 ===
Minnesota's 8th State Senate district election, 1914
Party	Candidate	Votes	%
Nonpartisan	John W. Andrews	2,949	51.13%
Nonpartisan	John H. Hohmann	2,819	48.87%
Total votes		5,768	100.0%
Nonpartisan hold			

=== District 9 ===
Minnesota's 9th State Senate district election, 1914
Party	Candidate	Votes	%
Nonpartisan	Albert L. Ward	3,800	100.0%
Total votes		3,800	100.0%
Nonpartisan hold			

=== District 10 ===
Minnesota's 10th State Senate district election, 1914
Party	Candidate	Votes	%
Nonpartisan	Charles W. Gillam	2,904	62.78%
Nonpartisan	Andrew C. Olson (incumbent)	1,722	37.22%
Total votes		4,626	100.0%
Nonpartisan gain from Nonpartisan			

=== District 11 ===
Minnesota's 11th State Senate district election, 1914
Party	Candidate	Votes	%
Nonpartisan	Samuel B. Nelson	2,432	61.04%
Nonpartisan	Salathiel B. Bedford (incumbent)	1,552	38.96%
Total votes		3,984	100.0%
Nonpartisan gain from Nonpartisan			

=== District 12 ===
Minnesota's 12th State Senate district election, 1914
Party	Candidate	Votes	%
Nonpartisan	John Steffen	2,655	50.50%
Nonpartisan	Edward W. Davies	2,602	49.50%
Total votes		5,257	100.00%
Nonpartisan hold			

=== District 13 ===
Minnesota's 13th State Senate district election, 1914
Party	Candidate	Votes	%
Nonpartisan	Olai A. Lende (incumbent)	3,096	57.63%
Nonpartisan	Christian K. Melby	2,276	42.37%
Total votes		5,372	100.00%
Nonpartisan hold			

=== District 14 ===
Minnesota's 14th State Senate district election, 1914
Party	Candidate	Votes	%
Nonpartisan	LaForest E. Potter	3,403	50.41%
Nonpartisan	William W. Smith	3,348	49.59%
Total votes		6,751	100.00%
Nonpartisan hold			

=== District 15 ===
Minnesota's 15th State Senate district election, 1914
Party	Candidate	Votes	%
Nonpartisan	Henry N. Benson (incumbent)	2,822	51.11%
Nonpartisan	Ole Peterson	2,699	48.89%
Total votes		5,521	100.00%
Nonpartisan hold			

=== District 16 ===
Minnesota's 16th State Senate district election, 1914
Party	Candidate	Votes	%
Nonpartisan	Eugene B. Collester	3,377	55.67%
Nonpartisan	Samuel A. Rask	2,689	44.33%
Total votes		6,066	100.00%
Nonpartisan hold			

=== District 17 ===
Minnesota's 17th State Senate district election, 1914
Party	Candidate	Votes	%
Nonpartisan	Harry F. Weis (incumbent)	2,688	66.93%
Nonpartisan	William S. O'Connell	1,328	33.07%
Total votes		4,016	100.00%
Nonpartisan hold			

=== District 18 ===
Minnesota's 18th State Senate district election, 1914
Party	Candidate	Votes	%
Nonpartisan	Frank L. Glotzbach (incumbent)	2,603	55.81%
Nonpartisan	Ferdinand L. Klemer	2,061	44.19%
Total votes		4,664	100.00%
Nonpartisan hold			

=== District 19 ===
Minnesota's 19th State Senate district election, 1914
Party	Candidate	Votes	%
Nonpartisan	Anton Julius Rockne (incumbent)	3,184	57.56%
Nonpartisan	Jens K. Grondahl	2,348	42.44%
Total votes		5,532	100.00%
Nonpartisan hold			

=== District 20 ===
Minnesota's 20th State Senate district election, 1914
Party	Candidate	Votes	%
Nonpartisan	James M. Millett	2,233	50.54%
Nonpartisan	William H. Wescott	2,185	49.46%
Total votes		4,418	100.00%
Nonpartisan hold			

=== District 21 ===
Minnesota's 21st State Senate district election, 1914
Party	Candidate	Votes	%
Nonpartisan	John B. Ries	3,085	51.04%
Nonpartisan	John J. Farrell	2,959	48.96%
Total votes		6,044	100.00%
Nonpartisan hold			

=== District 22 ===
Minnesota's 22nd State Senate district election, 1914
Party	Candidate	Votes	%
Nonpartisan	Harlow H. Bonniwell	2,153	59.05%
Nonpartisan	Garfield W. Brown	1,493	40.95%
Total votes		3,646	100.00%
Nonpartisan hold			

=== District 23 ===
Minnesota's 23rd State Senate district election, 1914
Party	Candidate	Votes	%
Nonpartisan	Nathaniel John Holmberg	2,266	52.75%
Nonpartisan	Frank Murray	2,030	47.25%
Total votes		4,296	100.00%
Nonpartisan hold			

=== District 24 ===
Minnesota's 24th State Senate district election, 1914
Party	Candidate	Votes	%
Nonpartisan	Oluf Gjerset	2,513	50.35%
Nonpartisan	Carl M. Anderson	2,478	49.65%
Total votes		4,991	100.00%
Nonpartisan hold			

=== District 25 ===
Minnesota's 25th State Senate district election, 1914
Party	Candidate	Votes	%
Nonpartisan	Peter Anners Gandrud	3,829	66.77%
Nonpartisan	Leo McDermott	1,906	33.23%
Total votes		5,735	100.00%
Nonpartisan hold			

=== District 26 ===
Minnesota's 26th State Senate district election, 1914
Party	Candidate	Votes	%
Nonpartisan	Edward P. Peterson (incumbent)	2,345	72.13%
Nonpartisan	Jonathan W. Wright	906	27.87%
Total votes		3,251	100.00%
Nonpartisan hold			

=== District 27 ===
Minnesota's 27th State Senate district election, 1914
Party	Candidate	Votes	%
Nonpartisan	John T. Alley	2,662	57.11%
Nonpartisan	George C. Carpenter (incumbent)	1,999	42.89%
Total votes		4,661	100.00%
Nonpartisan gain from Nonpartisan			

=== District 28 ===
Minnesota's 28th State Senate district election, 1914
Party	Candidate	Votes	%
Nonpartisan	Jeremiah G. Callahan	2,086	54.65%
Nonpartisan	Napoleon A. L'Herault (incumbent)	1,731	45.35%
Total votes		3,817	100.00%
Nonpartisan gain from Nonpartisan			

=== District 29 ===
Minnesota's 29th State Senate district election, 1914
Party	Candidate	Votes	%
Nonpartisan	Frank L. Palmer	2,880	55.35%
Nonpartisan	William B. Henderson	2,323	44.65%
Total votes		5,203	100.00%
Nonpartisan hold			

=== District 30 ===
Minnesota's 30th State Senate district election, 1914
Party	Candidate	Votes	%
Nonpartisan	William S. Dwinnell (incumbent)	1,854	50.77%
Nonpartisan	Fred B. Wright	1,798	49.23%
Total votes		3,652	100.00%
Nonpartisan hold			

=== District 31 ===
Minnesota's 31st State Senate district election, 1914
Party	Candidate	Votes	%
Nonpartisan	Ellis J. Westlake	2,368	64.73%
Nonpartisan	John G. Lennon	1,290	35.27%
Total votes		3,658	100.00%
Nonpartisan hold			

=== District 32 ===
Minnesota's 32nd State Senate district election, 1914
Party	Candidate	Votes	%
Nonpartisan	William A. Campbell	2,803	66.00%
Nonpartisan	John A. Nordin	1,444	34.00%
Total votes		4,247	100.00%
Nonpartisan hold			

=== District 33 ===
Minnesota's 33rd State Senate district election, 1914
Party	Candidate	Votes	%
Nonpartisan	Thomas J. Grose	3,292	51.76%
Nonpartisan	William Ignatius Nolan	3,068	48.24%
Total votes		6,360	100.00%
Nonpartisan hold			

=== District 34 ===
Minnesota's 34th State Senate district election, 1914
Party	Candidate	Votes	%
Nonpartisan	Carleton L. Wallace (incumbent)	4,471	100.00%
Total votes		4,471	100.00%
Nonpartisan hold			

=== District 35 ===
Minnesota's 35th State Senate district election, 1914
Party	Candidate	Votes	%
Nonpartisan	John W. Pauly (incumbent)	3,000	55.45%
Nonpartisan	James H. Duryea	2,410	44.55%
Total votes		5,410	100.00%
Nonpartisan hold			

=== District 36 ===
Minnesota's 36th State Senate district election, 1914
Party	Candidate	Votes	%
Nonpartisan	George A. Turnham	2,313	53.11%
Nonpartisan	Alexander McNeil	2,042	46.89%
Total votes		4,355	100.00%
Nonpartisan hold			

=== District 37 ===
Minnesota's 37th State Senate district election, 1914
Party	Candidate	Votes	%
Nonpartisan	Joseph A. Jackson	2,100	52.42%
Nonpartisan	Charles A. Oberg	1,906	47.58%
Total votes		4,006	100.00%
Nonpartisan hold			

=== District 38 ===
Minnesota's 38th State Senate district election, 1914
Party	Candidate	Votes	%
Nonpartisan	James Handlan (incumbent)	2,624	52.38%
Nonpartisan	Alwin Rowe	2,386	47.62%
Total votes		5,010	100.00%
Nonpartisan hold			

=== District 39 ===
Minnesota's 39th State Senate district election, 1914
Party	Candidate	Votes	%
Nonpartisan	Peter Van Hoven (incumbent)	3,289	63.98%
Nonpartisan	Emil Novotny	1,852	36.02%
Total votes		5,141	100.00%
Nonpartisan hold			

=== District 40 ===
Minnesota's 40th State Senate district election, 1914
Party	Candidate	Votes	%
Nonpartisan	James D. Denegre	3,883	100.00%
Total votes		3,883	100.00%
Nonpartisan hold			

=== District 41 ===
Minnesota's 41st State Senate district election, 1914
Party	Candidate	Votes	%
Nonpartisan	Winslow W. Dunn (incumbent)	2,955	100.00%
Total votes		2,955	100.00%
Nonpartisan hold			

=== District 42 ===
Minnesota's 42nd State Senate district election, 1914
Party	Candidate	Votes	%
Nonpartisan	Charles N. Orr	3,270	57.35%
Nonpartisan	Edwin G. Perry	2,432	42.65%
Total votes		5,702	100.00%
Nonpartisan hold			

=== District 43 ===
Minnesota's 43rd State Senate district election, 1914
Party	Candidate	Votes	%
Nonpartisan	George H. Sullivan (incumbent)	2,202	59.50%
Nonpartisan	Randolph A. Wilkinson	1,499	40.50%
Total votes		3,701	100.00%
Nonpartisan hold			

=== District 44 ===
Minnesota's 44th State Senate district election, 1914
Party	Candidate	Votes	%
Nonpartisan	Theodore C. Blomgren	2,616	69.70%
Nonpartisan	Edwin Spencer Cahoon	1,137	30.30%
Total votes		3,753	100.00%
Nonpartisan hold			

=== District 45 ===
Minnesota's 45th State Senate district election, 1914
Party	Candidate	Votes	%
Nonpartisan	John D. Sullivan (incumbent)	3,668	100.00%
Total votes		3,668	100.00%
Nonpartisan hold			

=== District 46 ===
Minnesota's 46th State Senate district election, 1914
Party	Candidate	Votes	%
Nonpartisan	Pierre A. Hilbert	3,208	100.00%
Total votes		3,208	100.00%
Nonpartisan hold			

=== District 47 ===
Minnesota's 47th State Senate district election, 1914
Party	Candidate	Votes	%
Nonpartisan	Engebret E. Lobeck	2,755	53.28%
Nonpartisan	Thomas T. Ofsthun	2,416	46.72%
Total votes		5,171	100.00%
Nonpartisan hold			

=== District 48 ===
Minnesota's 48th State Senate district election, 1914
Party	Candidate	Votes	%
Nonpartisan	Edward Rustad (incumbent)	4,682	100.00%
Total votes		4,682	100.00%
Nonpartisan hold			

=== District 49 ===
Minnesota's 49th State Senate district election, 1914
Party	Candidate	Votes	%
Nonpartisan	Frank H. Peterson	2,457	50.74%
Nonpartisan	Alfred A. Haagenson	2,385	49.26%
Total votes		4,842	100.00%
Nonpartisan hold			

=== District 50 ===
Minnesota's 50th State Senate district election, 1914
Party	Candidate	Votes	%
Nonpartisan	Ole O. Sageng (incumbent)	2,913	51.08%
Nonpartisan	Andrew Gerhard Anderson	2,790	48.92%
Total votes		5,703	100.00%
Nonpartisan hold			

=== District 51 ===
Minnesota's 51st State Senate district election, 1914
Party	Candidate	Votes	%
Nonpartisan	James Johnston (incumbent)	2,656	51.64%
Nonpartisan	Arthur B. Church	2,487	48.36%
Total votes		5,143	100.00%
Nonpartisan hold			

=== District 52 ===
Minnesota's 52nd State Senate district election, 1914
Party	Candidate	Votes	%
Nonpartisan	Patrick H. McGarry	2,613	53.83%
Nonpartisan	William J. Stock	2,241	46.17%
Total votes		4,854	100.00%
Nonpartisan hold			

=== District 53 ===
Minnesota's 53rd State Senate district election, 1914
Party	Candidate	Votes	%
Nonpartisan	George H. Gardner	3,427	51.77%
Nonpartisan	Charles D. Johnson (incumbent)	3,193	48.23%
Total votes		6,620	100.00%
Nonpartisan gain from Nonpartisan			

=== District 54 ===
Minnesota's 54th State Senate district election, 1914
Party	Candidate	Votes	%
Nonpartisan	Fred D. Vibert	2,594	61.84%
Nonpartisan	Charles D. Viebahn	1,601	38.16%
Total votes		4,195	100.00%
Nonpartisan hold			

=== District 55 ===
Minnesota's 55th State Senate district election, 1914
Party	Candidate	Votes	%
Nonpartisan	Robert C. Dunn	3,292	100.00%
Total votes		3,292	100.00%
Nonpartisan hold			

=== District 56 ===
Minnesota's 56th State Senate district election, 1914
Party	Candidate	Votes	%
Nonpartisan	John A. Rystrom	2,398	51.16%
Nonpartisan	Peter A. Christianson	2,289	48.84%
Total votes		4,687	100.00%
Nonpartisan hold			

=== District 57 ===
Minnesota's 57th State Senate district election, 1914
Party	Candidate	Votes	%
Nonpartisan	Charles E. Adams	3,006	60.42%
Nonpartisan	Alex G. McKnight	1,969	39.58%
Total votes		4,975	100.00%
Nonpartisan hold			

=== District 58 ===
Minnesota's 58th State Senate district election, 1914
Party	Candidate	Votes	%
Nonpartisan	Richard T. Jones	1,655	52.93%
Nonpartisan	Thomas M. Pugh (incumbent)	1,472	47.07%
Total votes		3,127	100.00%
Nonpartisan gain from Nonpartisan			

=== District 59 ===
Minnesota's 59th State Senate district election, 1914
Party	Candidate	Votes	%
Nonpartisan	George M. Peterson	2,128	55.32%
Nonpartisan	Phil G. Phillips	1,719	44.68%
Total votes		3,847	100.00%
Nonpartisan hold			

=== District 60 ===
Minnesota's 60th State Senate district election, 1914
Party	Candidate	Votes	%
Nonpartisan	John A. Healy	2,029	100.00%
Total votes		2,029	100.00%
Nonpartisan hold			

=== District 61 ===
Minnesota's 61st State Senate district election, 1914
Party	Candidate	Votes	%
Nonpartisan	Orrin H. Griggs	2,852	100.00%
Total votes		2,852	100.00%
Nonpartisan hold			

=== District 62 ===
Minnesota's 62nd State Senate district election, 1914
Party	Candidate	Votes	%
Nonpartisan	Leonard H. Nord	3,017	60.96%
Nonpartisan	F.A. Wilson	1,612	32.57%
Nonpartisan	Walter N. Weber	320	6.47%
Total votes		4,949	100.00%
Nonpartisan hold			

=== District 63 ===
Minnesota's 63rd State Senate district election, 1914
Party	Candidate	Votes	%
Nonpartisan	John Harvey Baldwin	2,691	64.29%
Nonpartisan	Charles F. Scheers	1,495	35.71%
Total votes		4,186	100.00%
Nonpartisan hold			

=== District 64 ===
Minnesota's 64th State Senate district election, 1914
Party	Candidate	Votes	%
Nonpartisan	Albert L. Hanson (incumbent)	2,203	100.00%
Total votes		2,203	100.00%
Nonpartisan hold			

=== District 65 ===
Minnesota's 65th State Senate district election, 1914
Party	Candidate	Votes	%
Nonpartisan	Daniel P. O'Neill	2,139	51.85%
Nonpartisan	Christian L. Hansen	1,986	48.15%
Total votes		4,125	100.00%
Nonpartisan hold			

=== District 66 ===
Minnesota's 66th State Senate district election, 1914
Party	Candidate	Votes	%
Nonpartisan	Richard Thompson Buckler	2,593	50.38%
Nonpartisan	John Saugstad (incumbent)	2,554	49.62%
Total votes		5,147	100.00%
Nonpartisan gain from Nonpartisan			

=== District 67 ===
Minnesota's 66th State Senate district election, 1914
Party	Candidate	Votes	%
Nonpartisan	Nels S. Hegnes	3,595	53.30%
Nonpartisan	Bengt E. Sundberg (incumbent)	3,150	46.70%
Total votes		6,745	100.00%
Nonpartisan gain from Nonpartisan			

== See also ==
- 1914 Minnesota House of Representatives election
- 1914 Minnesota gubernatorial election
