= Senator Olson =

Senator Olson may refer to:

- Alan Olson (born 1956), Montana State Senate
- Alec G. Olson (born 1930), Minnesota State Senate
- Andrew C. Olson (1866–1920), Minnesota State Senate
- Conrad P. Olson (1882–1952), Oregon State Senate
- Culbert Olson (1876–1962), California State Senate
- Donny Olson (born 1953), Alaska State Senate
- Gen Olson (born 1938), Minnesota State Senate
- Howard Olson (1937–1996), Minnesota State Senate
- John Olson (Minnesota politician) (1906–1981), Minnesota State Senate
- Mary Olson (born 1958), Minnesota State Senate
- Melvin Olson (1887–1962), Wisconsin State Senate
- Obert A. Olson (1882–1938), North Dakota State Senate
- Ole H. Olson (1872–1954), North Dakota State Senate
- Oscar R. Olson (1869–1945), Wisconsin State Senate
- Robert S. Olson (born 1969), Kansas State Senate
- William Olson (1873–1931), Wisconsin State Senate

== See also ==
- Senator Olsen (disambiguation)
