= Collin Peterson =

American accountant & politician (born 1944)

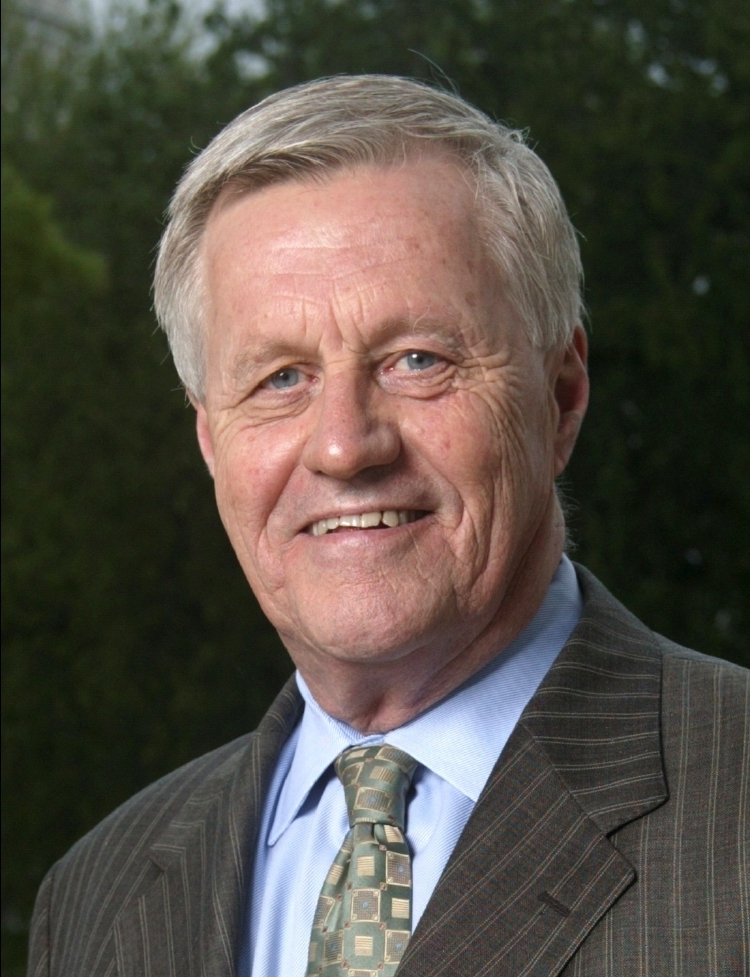
- Official portrait, 2012

Chair of the House Agriculture Committee
- In office January 3, 2019 – January 3, 2021
- Preceded by: Mike Conaway
- Succeeded by: David Scott
- In office January 3, 2007 – January 3, 2011
- Preceded by: Bob Goodlatte
- Succeeded by: Frank Lucas

Member of the U.S. House of Representatives from Minnesota's 7th district
- In office January 3, 1991 – January 3, 2021
- Preceded by: Arlan Stangeland
- Succeeded by: Michelle Fischbach

Member of the Minnesota Senate from the 10th district
- In office January 4, 1977 – January 5, 1987
- Preceded by: Roger L. Hanson
- Succeeded by: Cal Larson

Personal details
- Born: Collin Clark Peterson; June 29, 1944 (age 81) Fargo, North Dakota, U.S.
- Party: Democratic
- Education: Minnesota State University Moorhead (BA)

Military service
- Allegiance: United States
- Branch/service: United States Army
- Years of service: 1963–1969
- Unit: Army National Guard
- Peterson's voice Peterson opening a House Agriculture Committee hearing on the 2007 pet food recalls. Recorded May 9, 2007

Collin Clark Peterson (born June 29, 1944) is an American accountant, politician, and lobbyist who served as the U.S. representative for Minnesota's 7th congressional district from 1991 to 2021. A member of the Minnesota Democratic–Farmer–Labor Party (DFL), he was chairman of the House Committee on Agriculture from 2019 to 2021 having previously held the office from 2007 to 2011; he had been ranking member from 2011 to 2019 and 2005 to 2007. Peterson was the most senior U.S. representative from Minnesota and the dean of Minnesota's congressional delegation. In 2020, Peterson was defeated by Michelle Fischbach, ending his 30-year tenure in the United States House of Representatives. In 2022, Peterson registered as a federal lobbyist after opening an eponymous consulting firm.

== Early life, education, and early political career ==
Collin Peterson was born in Fargo, North Dakota, grew up on a farm in Baker, Minnesota, and received his B.A. at Minnesota State University Moorhead.

Peterson was a member of the Minnesota Senate for the Democratic–Farmer–Labor Party (the Minnesota branch of the Democratic Party) from 1977 to 1986, representing a district in northwestern Minnesota. In 1976, he defeated Republican nominee Frank DeGroat 55%-45%. In 1982, he won re-election against state representative Cal Larson by just 200 votes, or 0.8% difference.

== U.S. House of Representatives ==
=== Elections ===
==== 1980s ====
In 1984, he ran for Minnesota's 7th congressional district in Northwestern Minnesota, held by Republican Arlan Stangeland. Peterson lost 57%–43%. In 1986, he ran in a rematch and narrowly lost by just 121 votes. In 1988, he ran again but lost in the DFL primary to state senator Marv Hanson 55%–45%. Hanson went on to lose to Stangeland 55%–45%.

==== 1990s ====
In 1990, he ran for a fourth time and won the primary. In the general election, he finally defeated seven-term incumbent Stangeland by 54%–46%. Stangeland's stock had dropped sharply after he admitted to making a number of personal calls on his House credit card.

In 1992, Peterson narrowly won re-election by a 50%–49% margin against former state representative Bernie Omann. In a 1994 rematch, Peterson won again by a 51%–49% margin, despite the Republican Revolution. In 1996, he won re-election with 68% of the vote, and won every county in the district. In 1998, he won re-election with 72% of the vote.

==== 2000s ====
In the 2000s, Peterson never faced a serious re-election challenge and only once did he win re-election with less than two-thirds of the vote. In 2000, he was mentioned as a possible candidate for the U.S. Senate against Republican Rod Grams, but he chose to run for re-election, winning with 69% of the vote. In 2002, he won with 65% of the vote. In 2004, he won with 66% of the vote. In 2006, he won with 70% of the vote. In 2008, he won with 72% of the vote.

==== 2010s ====
In 2010, Peterson survived another Republican wave election. This time, he defeated Lee Byberg 55%–38%, his worst election performance since 1994. In 2012, Peterson won re-election with 60.38% to Republican Lee Byberg's 34.85% and Independent Adam Steele's 4.67%.

In 2013, Republicans began pressuring Peterson, in hopes of convincing him to retire. His seat was one of only a handful represented by a Democrat which had been carried by Mitt Romney in the 2012 election. Republican opposition tactics included airing television advertisements, hiring a press staffer to give opposition research to reporters, hiring a tracker to follow him around his district and record him, and sending mobile billboards with critical statements on them to drive around his hometown. Peterson responded by saying, "They don't have anybody else to go after. It's kind of ridiculous, but whatever." After Republicans spread rumors that Peterson was planning to buy a house in Florida and retire there, he said: "I went from neutral on running again to 90 percent just because of this stupid stuff they're doing. You can't let these people be in charge of anything, in my opinion." On March 17, 2014, Peterson officially announced that he was running for re-election, saying, "I still have a lot of work to do". Despite being heavily targeted by national Republican groups, Peterson defeated Republican state senator Torrey Westrom in the general election by 54% to 46%.

In October 2014, Peterson said that he may keep running until 2020 because the Republicans "made me mad" with their efforts to defeat him or persuade him to retire. In January 2015, he stated that he was "running at this point" for re-election in 2016, saying that the efforts by Republicans to unseat him had "energized me" and "got me fired up". He was challenged by Republican retired Air Force Major Dave Hughes and beat him in close races in 2016 and 2018.

Peterson held onto his seat despite a growing Republican trend in the region. From 2000 to 2016, the Republican presidential candidate carried it by double digits three out of five times. This culminated in 2016, when Donald Trump carried the district with 62 percent of the vote, his best showing in the state. Peterson thus sat in one of the most Republican districts in the country to be represented by a Democrat. His situation would be similar to Rep. Gene Taylor who represented Mississippi 4th congressional district in a very red district with a cook partisan of R+20 until being beaten by Steven Palazzo in the 2010 US House election.

In the November 2020 general election, Peterson was defeated for reelection by Republican former state senator and former lieutenant governor Michelle Fischbach. In that same election, Trump again carried the 7th with his best margin in the state, this time with 64 percent and a 29-point margin. Peterson lost to Fischbach by a 14-point margin, the largest margin of defeat for any House incumbent that year. Despite his loss, he was the top-performing Democratic representative compared to presidential nominee Joe Biden, outperforming him by 16 points in the district. Peterson was the only non-freshman member of the House of Representatives to lose re-election in 2020, and Minnesota's 7th district was one of only two congressional districts that Republicans flipped in 2020 that they did not hold prior to 2018, the other being Iowa's 2nd congressional district.

=== Committee assignments ===
116th Congress

- Committee on Agriculture (chairman)
  - As chairman of the whole committee, he served as an ex officio member on all subcommittees
- Committee on Veterans' Affairs

Past membership

- Committee on Agriculture (beginning with the 102nd Congress to present day; see: H.Res. 43)
  - Chairman & former Ranking Member. As ranking member of the full committee, Peterson may sit as an ex officio member of all subcommittees.
- Oversight and Government Reform
  - This was one of the first committees Peterson served on (102nd 103rd 104th & 105th Congresses).
- Committee on Veterans' Affairs
  - Began membership in the 106th and 107th Congress, and resumed membership in the 116th Congress.

=== Caucus membership ===
- Military Veterans Caucus, Co-chairman
- Congressional Arts Caucus

== Political positions ==
Peterson is one of the founders of the Blue Dog Coalition, the caucus of House Democrats who identify as moderates and conservatives. He was one of the most conservative Democrats in recent American history and frequently crossed the party line. Peterson had split from his party on issues such as gay marriage, healthcare, the estate tax, tort reform, gun control, the environment, DC statehood, and abortion. In 2008, a report by Congressional Quarterly found he had the lowest party loyalty score over the previous five years of any member of the Minnesota congressional delegation. In the 109th Congress, he was rated 50% conservative by a conservative group and 57% progressive by a liberal group.

During the first session of the 115th United States Congress, Peterson was ranked the most bipartisan member of the House of Representatives by the Bipartisan Index, a metric created by the Lugar Center and Georgetown's McCourt School of Public Policy to assess congressional bipartisanship.

=== Social issues ===
Peterson is generally conservative on social issues; he strongly opposes legal abortion and has been one of the few Democrats to vote against embryonic stem cell research. He has voted to ban physician-assisted suicide and also to approve the proposed Flag Desecration Amendment to the United States Constitution. He also voted for the Defense of Marriage Act and supports the death penalty.

In January 2019, in reference to President Trump's proposed wall across the southern border, Peterson said, "I'd give him the whole thing ... and put strings on it so you make sure he puts the wall where it needs to be. Why are we fighting over this? We're going to build that wall anyway, at some time." Peterson furthered that there could be stipulations requiring some funding go toward Border Patrol and security measures at ports of entry being improved.

On April 4, 2019, Peterson was the only Democrat to vote against the reauthorization of the Violence Against Women Act, citing his disappointment with the law being "made partisan with the inclusion of language that would strip individuals' right to due process with respect to their 2nd Amendment rights."

=== Hunting and conservationism ===
His district contains some of the most conservative counties in the state and also the state's most rural district; many DFLers outside the Twin Cities are hunters and trappers who oppose gun control. Peterson is a conservationist, but opposes "excessive environmental regulation" because he argues they harm farmers. He is an avid hunter and supports animal trapping, but in 2000 he joined with the Humane Society of the United States to pass legislation that stopped the interstate shipping of birds for cockfighting. He has supported legislation that would end protection for wolves in the Endangered Species Act.

In 2004, he joined with Minnesota attorney general Mike Hatch in suing the state of North Dakota over what they argued were discriminatory laws that forbade non–North Dakota residents from hunting during the first week of the waterfowl hunting season. Their case was rejected by the United States District Court for the District of North Dakota, a decision which was upheld by the United States Court of Appeals for the Eighth Circuit.

=== Guns ===
Peterson is a "staunch" supporter of gun rights. He has received successive "A" and "A+" ratings from the NRA Political Victory Fund (NRA-PVF), with endorsements in 2010, 2014 and 2020.

=== Economic issues ===
Although he's been called a strong fiscal conservative, he is somewhat closer to the left wing of his party on certain economic issues: he has voted against most free trade agreements, the North American Free Trade Agreement, the Freedom to Farm Act, and the Telecommunications Act of 1996. He also voted against both versions of the Patriot Act and he has been sharply critical of the No Child Left Behind Act, which he contends is unfair to rural students. He supports the FairTax, a national sales tax, estate-tax repeal and tort reform. He voted for the Bankruptcy Abuse Prevention and Consumer Protection Act.

Peterson joined the House Republicans in voting against the Omnibus Budget Reconciliation Act of 1993.

Along with John Conyers, in April 2006 Peterson brought an action against George W. Bush and others alleging violations of the Constitution in the passing of the Deficit Reduction Act of 2005. The case (Conyers v. Bush) was ultimately dismissed.

On January 28, 2009, Peterson was amongst the seven Democrats who voted in the House together with the unanimous Republican opposition against President Obama's stimulus package (American Recovery and Reinvestment Act of 2009).

=== International trade ===
In 1998, as part of an effort to change what were considered unequal fishing regulations between the U.S. and Canada, Peterson gained attention by proposing a constitutional amendment that would allow the residents of Minnesota's Northwest Angle to vote on whether they wanted to secede from the United States and join the Canadian province of Manitoba. Peterson said that the amendment, which was part of a mock secession movement, was successful in bringing the issue to the attention of the White House: "In just the day after I introduced (the amendment), people from the vice president's office have been asking questions, people in the White House (too). I've got meetings scheduled with the U.S. trade representative... we've educated people on both sides of the border, and I think we've brought it closer to the point where we'll get this thing resolved."

=== Healthcare ===
In 2003, he was one of just 16 Democrats to vote for President Bush's Medicare Prescription Drug, Improvement, and Modernization Act.

On March 21, 2010, Peterson voted against the Patient Protection and Affordable Care Act (also known as Obamacare). In January 2016, he voted to repeal the Affordable Care Act (he was the sole Democrat in the House to vote for the repeal). In 2017, he voted against Republican efforts to repeal the Affordable Care Act.

=== Agriculture ===
In January 2005, he was selected by the House Democratic Caucus to succeed former Texas congressman Charlie Stenholm as the ranking member on the Committee on Agriculture. He became the committee's chairman after the Democrats won control of the House two years later.

Peterson was a cosponsor of the Agricultural Job Opportunities, Benefits, and Security Act of 2005 which would provide job protection for three million illegal immigrant agricultural workers and their families, and extend the visas of legal immigrant agricultural workers.

In addition to this, Peterson was the chair of the House committee on Agriculture in the 116th Congress.

=== Military ===
Peterson was one of the few Democrats to vote in favor of the Military Commissions Act of 2006.

=== Price gouging ===
In May 2007, Peterson was the lone Democrat to vote against the Federal Price Gouging Prevention Act.

=== Hate crimes ===
In April 2009, Peterson voted against the Matthew Shepard and James Byrd, Jr. Hate Crimes Prevention Act.

=== Environmental issues ===
On May 6, 2009, Peterson voiced his opposition to climate change legislation proposed by the Obama administration saying, "I will not support any kind of climate change bill – even if you fix this – because I don't trust anybody anymore. I've had it." Peterson predicted that an Environmental Protection Agency proposal to assess indirect effects of ethanol production on greenhouse gas emissions, combined with the climate change legislation, could "kill off corn ethanol."

=== Town meetings ===
On July 27, 2009, a controversy erupted after Peterson was quoted in a Politico.com article saying, "25 percent of my people believe the Pentagon and Rumsfeld were responsible for taking the twin towers down. That's why I don't do town meetings." The state Republican Party denounced the remark as "outrageous and offensive". Peterson apologized for the comment, which he described as "off-hand".

=== Abortion ===
Peterson is an anti-abortion Democrat. In 2010, he was endorsed by the National Right to Life Committee.

In 2011, he co-sponsored HR 3, the No Taxpayer Funding for Abortion Act. The bill contained an exception for "forcible rape," which opponents criticized as potentially excluding drug-facilitated rape, date rape, and other forms of rape. The bill also allowed an exception for minors who are victims of incest.

=== LGBT rights ===
Peterson supported a Constitutional Amendment that would ban legal recognition of same-sex marriages in the United States.

=== Yemeni civil war ===
Peterson was one of five House Democrats who voted for the US to continue selling arms to Saudi Arabia and to support the Saudi Arabian-led intervention in Yemen. Asked why he voted against the resolution and what he knew about the Yemeni civil war, Peterson said, "I don't know a damn thing about it". Peterson also said that the resolution on US involvement in the Yemeni civil war would have jeopardized a farm bill that was under consideration at the same time; according to New York magazine's Eric Levitz, "by all accounts, voting against the Yemen resolution would not have doomed the farm bill."

=== Impeachment of Donald Trump ===
On October 31, 2019, he was one of two Democrats to vote against Article I of the impeachment inquiries against President Donald Trump, and one of the three Democrats to vote against Article II. He again was one of two Democrats, alongside Jeff Van Drew, to vote against impeachment on December 18, 2019.

In February 2021, Peterson stated that he would have voted in favor of the second impeachment if he was in the House.

=== D.C. statehood ===
On June 26, 2020, Peterson was the only Democratic representative to break with his party when he voted against H.R. 51, a bill that would allow for Washington, D.C., to be admitted as the country's 51st state.

=== Marijuana ===
Peterson was one of six House Democrats to vote against the Marijuana Opportunity Reinvestment and Expungement (MORE) Act to legalize cannabis at the federal level in 2020.

== Electoral history ==
2020

Minnesota's 7th congressional district, 2020
| Party | Candidate | Votes | % |
|---|---|---|---|
| Republican | Michelle Fischbach | 193,986 | 53.5 |
| Democratic (DFL) | Collin Peterson (incumbent) | 144,752 | 39.9 |
| Total votes | | | 100.0 |

2018

2018 Seventh Congressional District of Minnesota Elections
| Party | Candidate | Votes | % | ±% |
|---|---|---|---|---|
| Democratic (DFL) | Collin Peterson (incumbent) | 146,672 | 52.1 | −0.4 |
| Republican | Dave Hughes | 134,668 | 47.9 | +0.4 |
| N/A | others | 168 | >0.1 | − |

2016

2016 Seventh Congressional District of Minnesota Elections
| Party | Candidate | Votes | % | ±% |
|---|---|---|---|---|
| Democratic (DFL) | Collin Peterson (incumbent) | 173,589 | 52.5 | −1.7 |
| Republican | Dave Hughes | 156,952 | 47.4 | +1.7 |
| N/A | others | 307 | 0.1 | − |

2014

2014 Seventh Congressional District of Minnesota Elections
| Party | Candidate | Votes | % | ±% |
|---|---|---|---|---|
| Democratic (DFL) | Collin Peterson (incumbent) | 130,546 | 54.21 | −6.2 |
| Republican | Torrey Westrom | 109,955 | 45.66 | +10.9 |

2012

2012 Seventh Congressional District of Minnesota Elections
| Party | Candidate | Votes | % | ±% |
|---|---|---|---|---|
| Democratic (DFL) | Collin Peterson (incumbent) | 197,791 | 60.38 | +5.2 |
| Republican | Lee Byberg | 114,151 | 34.85 | −2.8 |
| Independence | Adam Steele | 15,298 | 4.67 | − |

2010

2010 Seventh Congressional District of Minnesota Elections
| Party | Candidate | Votes | % | ±% |
|---|---|---|---|---|
| Democratic (DFL) | Collin Peterson (incumbent) | 133,086 | 55.2 | −17 |
| Republican | Lee Byberg | 90,682 | 37.6 | − |
| Independent | Gene Waldorf | 9,310 | 3.9 | − |
| Independence | Glen Menze | 7,904 | 3.3 | −24.4 |

2008

2008 Seventh Congressional District of Minnesota Elections
| Party | Candidate | Votes | % | ±% |
|---|---|---|---|---|
| Democratic (DFL) | Collin Peterson (incumbent) | 227,180 | 72.2 | +2.2 |
| Republican | Glen Menze | 87,057 | 27.7 | − |

2006

2006 Seventh Congressional District of Minnesota Elections
| Party | Candidate | Votes | % | ±% |
|---|---|---|---|---|
| Democratic (DFL) | Collin Peterson (incumbent) | 179,163 | 69.7 | +4 |
| Republican | Michael Barrett | 74,680 | 29.0 | − |
| Constitution | Ken Lucier | 3,303 | 1.3 | − |

2004

2004 Seventh Congressional District of Minnesota Elections
| Party | Candidate | Votes | % | ±% |
|---|---|---|---|---|
| Democratic (DFL) | Collin Peterson (incumbent) | 207,254 | 66.1 | − |
| Republican | David Sturrock | 106,235 | 33.8 | − |

2002

2002 Seventh Congressional District of Minnesota Elections
| Party | Candidate | Votes | % | ±% |
|---|---|---|---|---|
| Democratic (DFL) | Collin Peterson (incumbent) | 170,191 | 65.3 | − |
| Republican | Dan Stevens | 90,320 | 34.7 | |

2000

2000 Seventh Congressional District of Minnesota Elections
| Party | Candidate | Votes | % | ±% |
|---|---|---|---|---|
| Democratic (DFL) | Collin Peterson (incumbent) | 185,771 | 68.7 | − |
| Republican | Glen Menze | 79,175 | 29.3 | − |
| | Write In | 5,550 | 0.02 | − |

1998

1998 Seventh Congressional District of Minnesota Elections
| Party | Candidate | Votes | % | ±% |
|---|---|---|---|---|
| Democratic (DFL) | Collin Peterson (incumbent) | 169,907 | 71.7 | − |
| Republican | Aleta Edin | 66,562 | 28.1 | − |
| | Write In | 473 | 0.2 | − |

1996

1996 Seventh Congressional District of Minnesota Elections
| Party | Candidate | Votes | % | ±% |
|---|---|---|---|---|
| Democratic (DFL) | Collin Peterson (incumbent) | 170,936 | 68.1 | − |
| Republican | Darrell McKigney | 80,132 | 31.9 | − |

1994

1994 Seventh Congressional District of Minnesota Elections
| Party | Candidate | Votes | % | ±% |
|---|---|---|---|---|
| Democratic (DFL) | Collin Peterson (incumbent) | 106,023 | 51.3 | − |
| Ind.-Republican | Bernie Omann | 102,623 | 48.7 | − |

1992

1992 Seventh Congressional District of Minnesota Elections
| Party | Candidate | Votes | % | ±% |
|---|---|---|---|---|
| Democratic (DFL) | Collin Peterson (incumbent) | 133,886 | 50.67 | − |
| Ind.-Republican | Bernie Omann | 130,396 | 49.33 | − |

1990

1990 Seventh Congressional District of Minnesota Elections
| Party | Candidate | Votes | % | ±% |
|---|---|---|---|---|
| Democratic (DFL) | Collin Peterson | 107,126 | 53.51 | − |
| Ind.-Republican | Arlan Stangeland (incumbent) | 92,876 | 46.40 | − |

== Personal life ==
Peterson lives in Detroit Lakes, just east of Moorhead. He is divorced and previously dated former congresswoman Katherine Harris, the former Republican secretary of state of Florida. He is a licensed private pilot and would frequently travel by private plane across his district.

In December 2005, Peterson joined four Republicans to form the Second Amendments, a rock and country band.

== See also ==
- Minnesota's congressional delegations
- List of United States representatives from Minnesota

U.S. House of Representatives
| Preceded by Arlan Stangeland | Member of the U.S. House of Representatives from Minnesota's 7th congressional district 1991–2021 | Succeeded by Michelle Fischbach |
| Preceded by Charles Stenholm | Ranking Member of the House Agriculture Committee; 2005–2007 | Succeeded by Bob Goodlatte |
| Preceded by Bob Goodlatte | Chair of the House Agriculture Committee; 2007–2011 | Succeeded by Frank Lucas |
| Preceded by Frank Lucas | Ranking Member of the House Agriculture Committee; 2011–2019 | Succeeded by Mike Conaway |
| Preceded by Mike Conaway | Chair of the House Agriculture Committee; 2019–2021 | Succeeded by David Scott |
Party political offices
| Preceded by Nathan Deal | Chair of the Blue Dog Coalition for Policy; 1995–1999; Served alongside: Gary Condit (Administration), John S. Tanner (Communications) | Succeeded by Charles Stenholm |
U.S. order of precedence (ceremonial)
| Preceded by Lucille Roybal-Allard as Former U.S. Representative | Order of precedence of the United States as Former U.S. Representative | Succeeded by Rick Boucher as Former U.S. Representative |
