= John R. Hills =

Connecticut politician

State Senator from Connecticut
- In office 1881–1883

Personal details
- Born: 3 October 1841 Hartford, Connecticut
- Died: 19 March 1915 (aged 73) Hartford, Connecticut, United States
- Spouse: Ella Willis
- Children: 3
- Occupation: politician

John R. Hills was an American politician and State Senator from Hartford, Connecticut. He ran several times for office, and even lost by a single vote in one election, according to the official count.

== Life ==
John R Hills was born to William Hills (1789–1838) and Jemima Reed (1809–1893). He served as a State Senator in the first district of Connecticut as a member of the Republican Party from 1881 till 1883. He died in 1915, aged 73.
