= William Addison Carroll =

American politician, minister (1837–1914)

William Addison Carroll (1837–1914) was a Methodist minister and state senator in West Virginia. He served in the West Virginia Senate from 1907 to 1910. He represented the Fifth District in 1909.

He was elected in a special election in 1907, succeeding J. D. Porter, who died.
