= Roger F. Noreen =

American lawyer and politician

Roger Noreen

Member of the Minnesota House of Representatives from the 57th District district
- In office 1955–1962
- Preceded by: Charles E. Campton
- Succeeded by: Frank DeGroat

Roger F. Noreen (October 24, 1922 – May 30, 1997) was an American lawyer and member of the Minnesota House of Representatives from 1955 to 1962. He was the only Republican representative from the heavily Democratic 6th District. Noreen was born in Duluth, Minnesota. He served in the United States Navy during World War II. Noreen received his bachelor's degree from University of Minnesota and his law degree from University of Minnesota Law School. Noreen was admitted to the Minnesota bar and practiced law in Duluth, Minnesota. He then moved to Saint Paul, Minnesota in 1961 and worked for West Publishing Company. Noreen died from cancer in Mendota Heights, Minnesota.
