= Gretchen Hoffman =

American politician

Member of the Minnesota Senate from the 10th district
- In office January 4, 2011 – January 7, 2013
- Preceded by: Dan Skogen
- Succeeded by: Carrie Ruud

Personal details
- Born: April 1957 (age 69) Fargo, North Dakota
- Party: Republican Party of Minnesota
- Spouse: Virgil
- Children: 3
- Occupation: Registered nurse, politician

Gretchen M. Hoffman (born April 1957) is a Minnesota politician and former member of the Minnesota Senate who represented District 10, which included all or parts of Becker, Otter Tail, and Wadena Counties in the northwest of the state. A Republican, she is a registered nurse and former small business owner.

== Early life, education, and medical career ==
Hoffman was born and raised in Fargo, North Dakota. She graduated from Fargo South High School and later completed her R.N. training. She has worked as a cardiac intensive care nurse, an emergency room nurse, a staff nurse, and a chemotherapy and oncology nurse. She sits on the board of directors of GPK Products, Inc., a family-owned manufacturer of PVC water and wastewater fittings. She also volunteers at a pro-life clinic as a receptionist and nurse. She is a member of the National Rifle Association of America.

== Minnesota Senate ==
=== 2010 election ===
Hoffman ran for the Minnesota Senate in the 10th district. She defeated incumbent Democratic State Senator Dan Skogen, 55%-45%.

=== Tenure ===
On May 20, 2011, during a Health and Human Services budget debate, Hoffman tweeted: "#Sen Goodwin just called people with mental illness- idiots and imbeciles- while debating HHS bill #offensive #mndfl #mnsrc #mnleg". As a result of this tweet, which Senator Barb Goodwin called "mean-spirited" and a deliberate misrepresentation of her statement, Senator Ann Rest filed an ethics complaint against Hoffman. The Subcommittee on Ethical Conduct found that Hoffman's statement was "clearly misleading with respect to Goodwin's position regarding the public policy concerning the treatment of individuals with mental illnesses and disabilities" and ordered Hoffman to issue a written apology. On June 21, 2011, the Ethics Committee dismissed the complaint after Hoffman apologized to Goodwin, removed her original tweet, and tweeted a link to the committee's report on the case.

=== Committee assignments ===
Hoffman was a member of the Capital Investment, the Health and Human Services, the Judiciary and Public Safety, and the Taxes committees. Her special legislative concerns included taxes, health and human services, and E-12 education.

== 2012 congressional race ==
After redistricting was completed and maps were released, Hoffman decided in February 2012 to run in Minnesota's 7th congressional district against incumbent Democratic U.S. Representative Collin Peterson, who represented Minnesota's 10th Senate District himself in the 1970s and 1980s. She did not earn the Republican Party's endorsement, which went to Lee Byberg. Byberg lost to Peterson in the general election.
