= Pole McPhetridge =

American state senator

Napoleon B. McPhetridge (died 1928) was an American lawyer, county examiner, and state senator in Arkansas. He was elected in 1880.

He was a Confederate States Army veteran and was known as "Colonel'.

The Arkansas Digital Archive has a vertical file on him.
