= Charles W. Gillam =

American politician

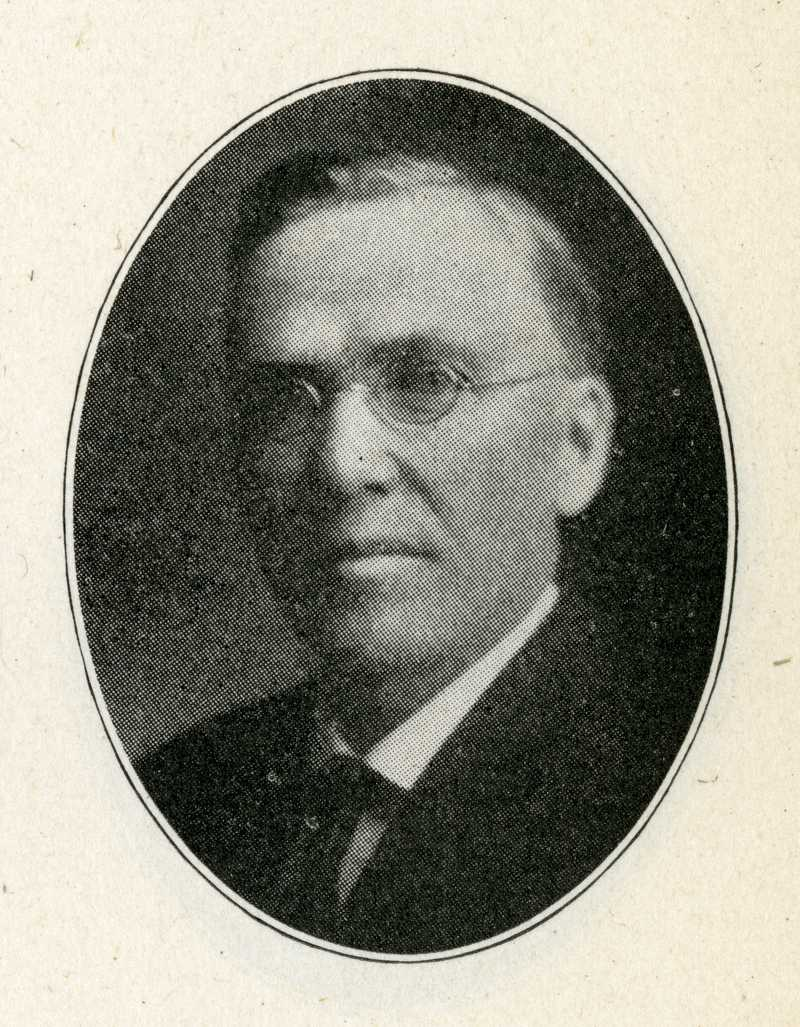

Member of the Minnesota Senate from the 10th district
- In office January 5, 1915 – January 3, 1927
- Preceded by: John Moonan
- Succeeded by: Ole J. Finstad

Personal details
- Born: 1861 Omro, Wisconsin, U.S.
- Died: 1933 (aged 71–72)
- Party: Nonpartisan
- Profession: Real estate broker, Banker, Legislator

Charles W. Gillam (1861–1933) was a state senator for Minnesota's 10th district serving Cottonwood and Jackson counties. Gillam was born in Omro, Wisconsin in 1861, but was educated in Windom Public Schools. He served in the Minnesota Senate from 1915 to 1926. He was preceded by Andrew Olson and succeeded by Moses Frost. Outside of his work as a senator, he was the vice-president of Windom National Bank and served as mayor of Windom, Minnesota for three terms. Gillam died in 1933.
