= Bjarne Elgar Grottum =

American politician (1893–1987)

Bjarne Edgar Grottum

Member of the Minnesota Senate from the 10th district
- In office 1947–1954
- Preceded by: Ole J. Finstad
- Succeeded by: Walter J. Franz

Personal details
- Born: August 9, 1893 Minneapolis, Minnesota
- Died: October 4, 1987 (aged 94) Mesa, Arizona
- Party: Minnesota Democratic–Farmer–Labor Party
- Education: University of Minnesota Law School
- Profession: Lawyer, Banker, Legislator

Bjarne Edgar Grottum (August 9, 1893 — October 4, 1987) was an American attorney who served as state senator for Minnesota's 10th district serving Cottonwood and Jackson counties.

Grottum was born in Minneapolis, Minnesota and raised on a farm in Jackson, Minnesota. He served in the U.S. Army during World War I. In 1920, he graduated from the University of Minnesota Law School.

He served in the senate from 1947 to 1954 as a member of the Minnesota Democratic–Farmer–Labor Party (DFLer) but "caucused with the Conservative majority of the Senate" and later stated that the "Legislature should be truly nonpartisan". He was preceded by Ole Finstad and succeeded by Walter Franz In addition to his work in the senate, he served as County Attorney for Jackson County for 12 years and served on the Board of Regents at the University of Minnesota (1961-1967). He died in Mesa, Arizona and was buried in the Delafield Cemetery in Jackson County, Minnesota.
