= Cal Larson =

American politician (1930–2024)

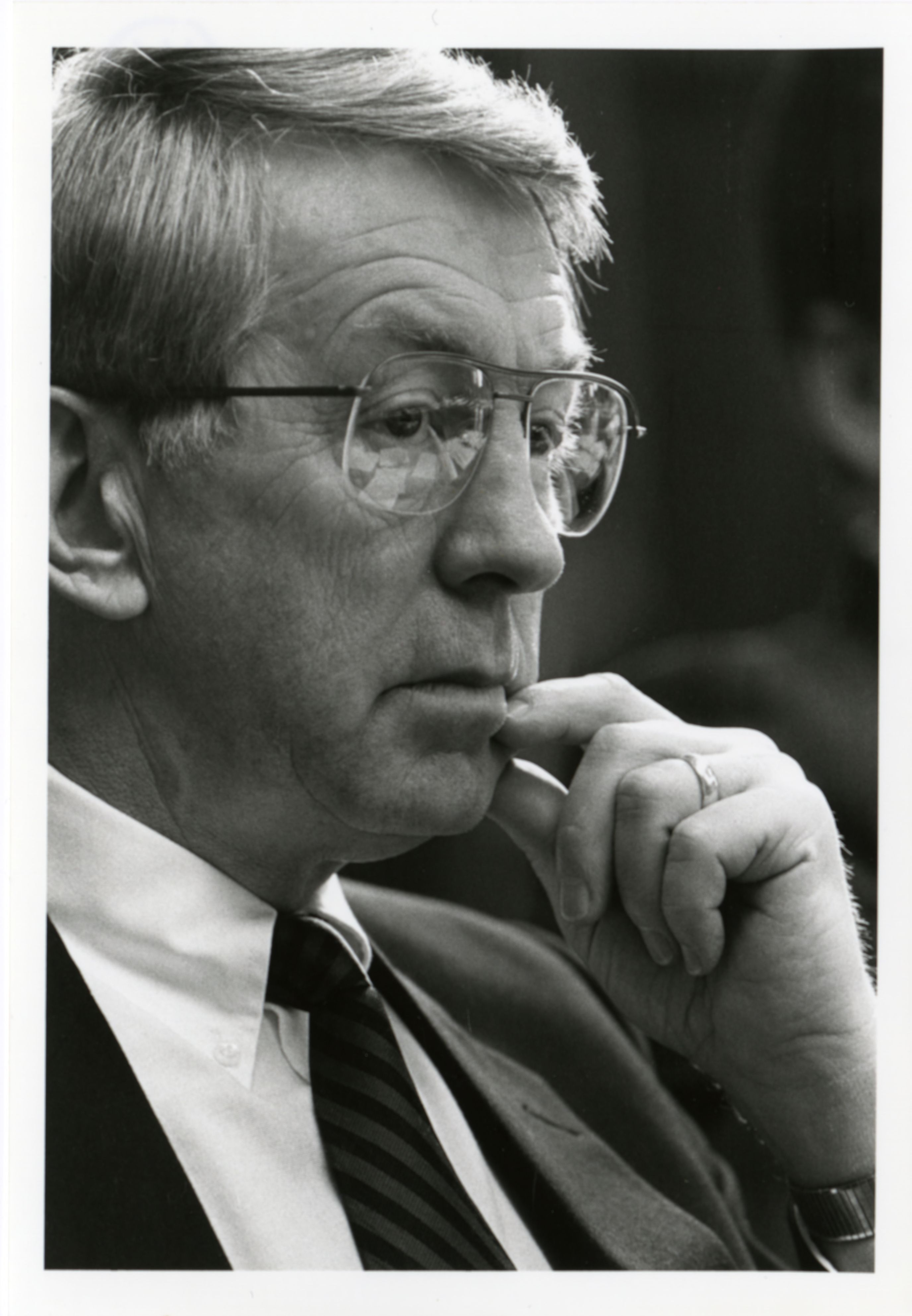

Member of the Minnesota Senate from the 10th district
- In office January 6, 1987 – January 2, 2007
- Preceded by: Collin Peterson
- Succeeded by: Dan Skogen

Member of the Minnesota House of Representatives
- In office January 3, 1967 – January 7, 1975
- Preceded by: Roy Emery Dunn
- Succeeded by: Gene R. Wenstrom
- Constituency: 55th district (1967–1973); 11A district (1973–1975)

Personal details
- Born: August 10, 1930 Glyndon, Minnesota, U.S.
- Died: April 1, 2024 (aged 93) Detroit Lakes, Minnesota, U.S.
- Party: Republican
- Other political affiliations: Independent (1986–1996)
- Education: Concordia College (BA)

Military service
- Branch/service: United States Navy
- Battles/wars: Korean War

Calvin R. Larson (August 10, 1930 – April 1, 2024) was an American politician who served as a member of the Minnesota House of Representatives from 1967 to 1974 and Minnesota Senate from 1987 to 2006.

== Early life and education ==
Born in Glyndon, Minnesota, Larson graduated from Badger High School in 1948 and earned a Bachelor of Arts degree from Concordia College. Larson then served in the United States Navy during the Korean War.

== Career ==
Larson was first elected to the Minnesota House of Representatives in 1967, with a Nonpartisan Election–Conservative Caucus party affiliation. He served district 55 for three terms, ending in 1972. He continued in the House from 1973 to 1974 representing district 11A.

Following an absence from the state legislature from 1975 to 1986, Larson was elected as State Senator for district 10 in 1986, as an Independent Republican. He continued to fill this seat in the Senate until 2006, but by the 1996 election had changed his party affiliation to Republican.

== Personal life ==
Larson resided in Fergus Falls, Minnesota, with his wife, Loretta. They have two children. Larson was a Lutheran.

Larson died on April 1, 2024, in Detroit Lakes, Minnesota, at the age of 93.

== Electoral history ==
2006 Minnesota State Senate District 10

- Cal Larson (R), 14191 votes, 44.71%
- Dan Skogen (DFL), 17530 votes, 55.23%
- Write-In, 18 votes, 0.06%

2002 Minnesota State Senate District 10

- Cal Larson (R), 19357 votes, 59.57%
- Karl L. Hanson (DFL), 13111 votes, 40.35%
- Write-In, 24 votes, 0.07%

Minnesota House of Representatives
| Preceded by Roy Emery Dunn | Member of the Minnesota House of Representatives from the 55th district 1967–1973 | Succeeded by Stanley J. "Stan" Fudro (District 55A); John Joseph Sarna (District 55B) |
| Preceded by C. A. "Gus, Little Gus" Johnson, Sr. | Member of the Minnesota House of Representatives from the 11A district 1973–1975 | Succeeded by Gene R. Wenstrom |
Minnesota Senate
| Preceded by Collin Peterson | Member of the Minnesota Senate from the 10th district 1987–2007 | Succeeded by Dan Skogen |
