= Senator Carley =

Senator Carley may refer to:

- James A. Carley (1869–1952), Minnesota State Senate
- John Carley (fl. 2020s), South Dakota State Senate
