= Darryl Peterson =

Darryl Peterson may refer to:

- Darryl Peterson or Maxx Payne (born 1961), American professional wrestler
- Darryl Peterson III, American football player

== See also ==
- Darrel Peterson (1939–1994), American politician
