= Senator Frost =

Senator Frost may refer to:

- Daniel M. Frost (1823–1900), Missouri State Senate
- Frank A. Frost (1874–1947), New York State Senate
- George L. Frost (1830–1879), Wisconsin State Senate
- Moses L. Frost (1871–1958), Minnesota State Senate
- Rufus S. Frost (1826–1894), Massachusetts State Senate
- Samuel H. Frost (1818–c. 1874), New York State Senate
