= Moses L. Frost =

American politician

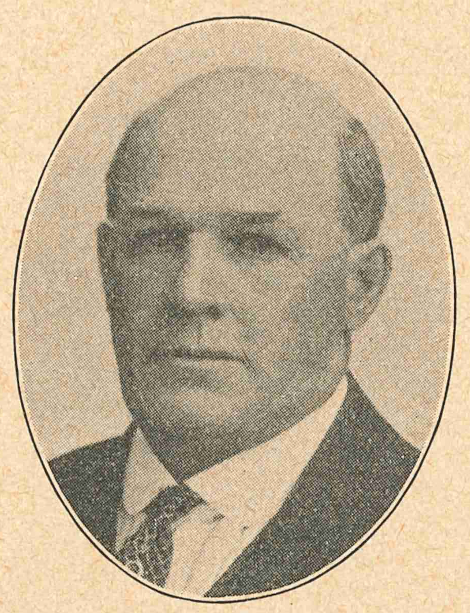

Member of the Minnesota Senate from the 10th district
- In office 1927–1930
- Preceded by: Charles W. Gillam
- Succeeded by: Ole J. Finstad

Personal details
- Born: August 25, 1871
- Died: October 3, 1958 (aged 87)
- Party: Nonpartisan
- Profession: Farmer, legislator

Moses L. Frost (August 25, 1871 – October 3, 1958) was a state senator for Minnesota's 10th district from Jackson, Minnesota. He was born on August 25, 1871, and died on October 3, 1958. He served in the Minnesota Senate from 1927 to 1930. He was preceded by Charles Gillam and was succeeded by Ole Finstad. In addition to his work in the Senate, Frost served 5 terms as mayor of Jackson.
