= Tracy Beckman =

American politician

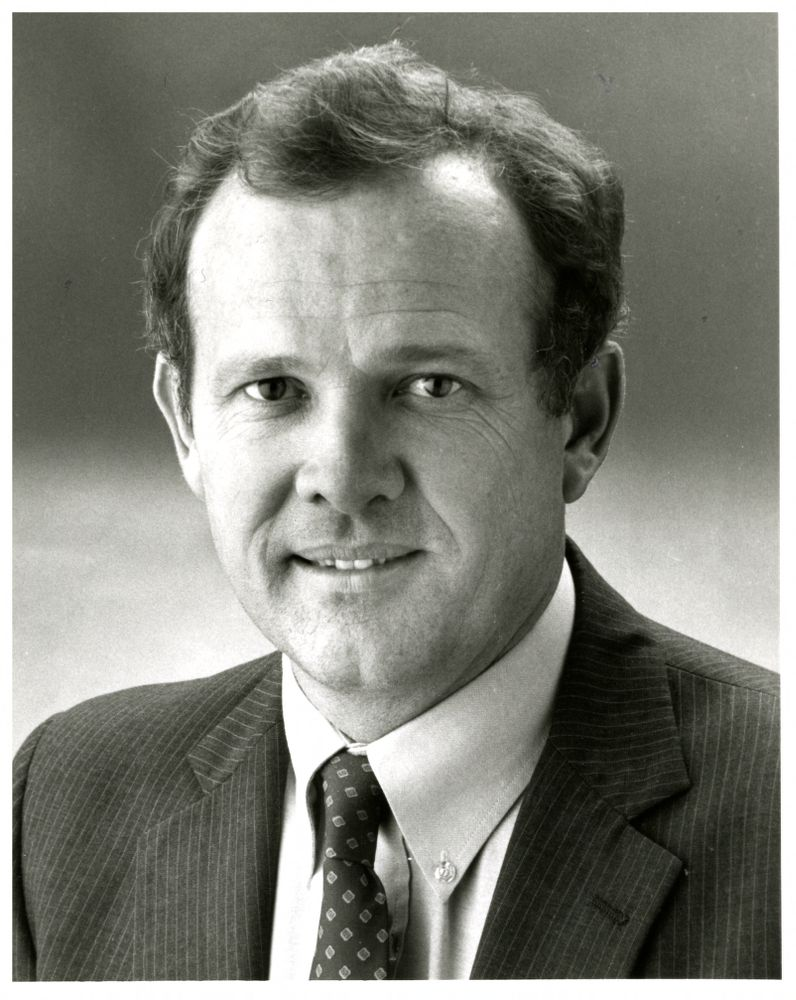
- Beckman in 1991

Member of the Minnesota Senate from the 29th and 26th district
- In office January 6, 1987 – February 26, 1999
- Preceded by: Darrel Peterson
- Succeeded by: Donald N. Ziegler

Personal details
- Born: January 7, 1945 (age 81)
- Party: Democratic-Farmer-Labor Party
- Spouse: Janel
- Children: 5
- Education: Mankato State University Harvard University
- Occupation: Government official, politician, business owner and manager

Tracy L. Beckman (born January 7, 1945) is a Minnesota politician and is a former member of the Minnesota Senate from southern Minnesota. First elected in 1986 in the Democratic-Farmer-Labor Party's "firestorm" that swept through the region, giving Democrats unprecedented control of southwestern Minnesota for the next several election cycles, Beckman served four terms. He was re-elected in 1990, 1992 and 1996. He represented the old District 29 and, later, District 26, which included all or portions of Blue Earth, Faribault, Freeborn, Martin, Waseca and Watonwan counties, changing somewhat through redistricting in 1990.

From the small town of Bricelyn, Beckman, a corn processing plant manager, consultant, hardware store owner and former teacher, earned a reputation as a strong advocate for agricultural issues, processing of agricultural products, small business development, rural economic development, job creation, education, crime prevention and health care during his time in office. He is a graduate of Mankato State University and Harvard University.

While in the legislature, Beckman was a member of the Senate Agriculture, Crime Prevention, Economic Development and Housing, Education, Employment, Energy and Community Development, Finance, Government Operations and Reform, Jobs, and Veterans committees, and of various sub-committees relevant to each area.

Beckman ran for Congress against incumbent Gil Gutknecht in 1998 in Minnesota's old 1st Congressional District. Prior to the current re-districting, the district encompassed most of southeastern Minnesota and was a heavily Republican area. Beckman received 45% of the vote to Gutknecht's 55% in the November general election.

In February 1999, Beckman resigned his Senate seat after he was appointed Minnesota State Director of the Farm Service Agency, a division of the U.S. Department of Agriculture.
