= Pelican Rapids, Minnesota =

City in Minnesota, United States

Pelican Rapids
- City
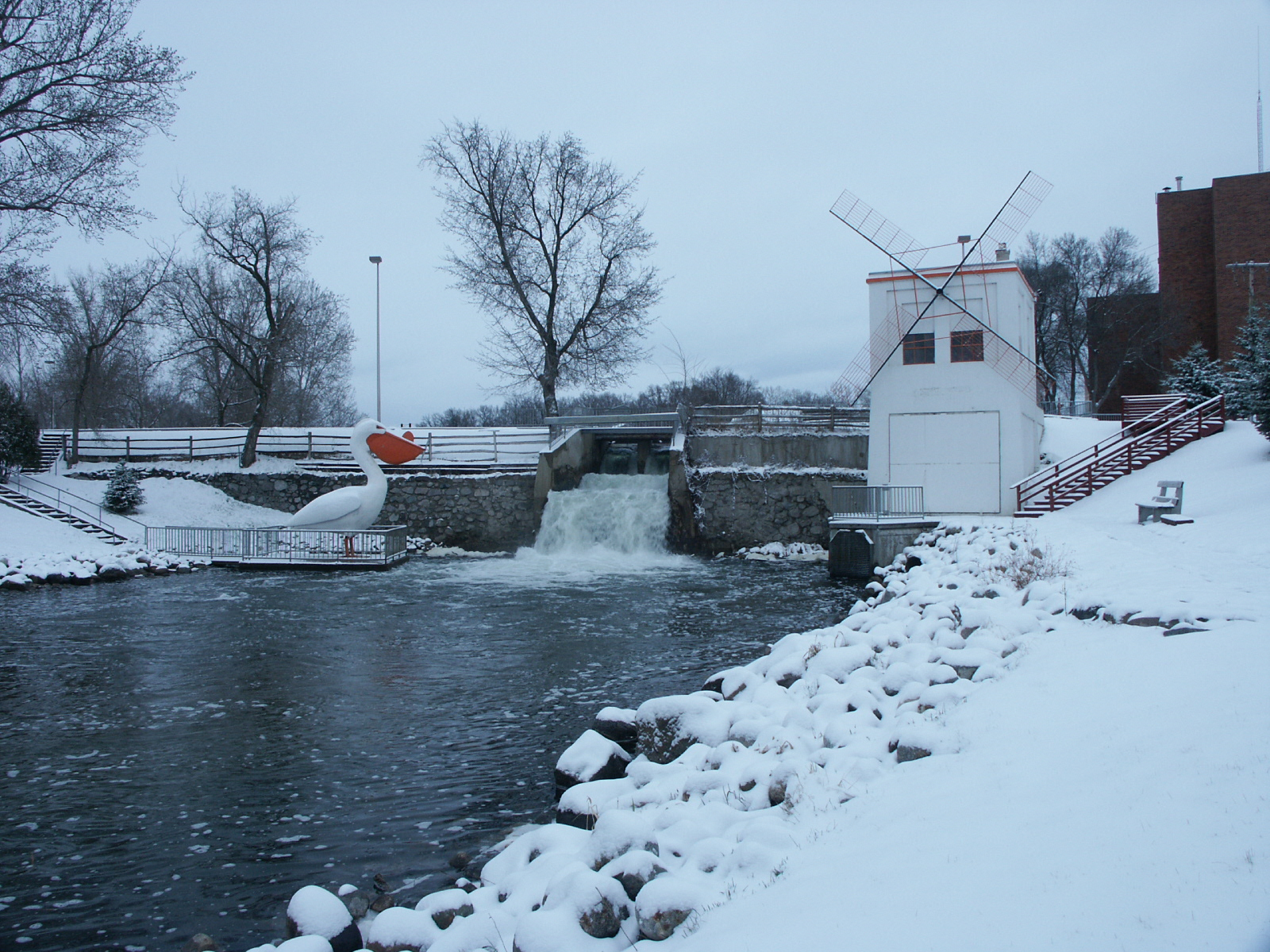
- Pelican Pete, the world's largest pelican statue, is in downtown Pelican Rapids

- Location of Pelican Rapids within Otter Tail County, Minnesota
- Coordinates: 46°34′12″N 96°05′10″W
- Country: United States
- State: Minnesota
- County: Otter Tail
- Founded: 1872
- Incorporated: December 10, 1883

Government
  - Mayor: Brent E Frazier

Area
  - Total: 2.69 sq mi (6.96 km^{2})
  - Land: 2.56 sq mi (6.64 km^{2})
  - Water: 0.12 sq mi (0.32 km^{2})
- Elevation: 1,296 ft (395 m)

Population (2020)
  - Total: 2,577
  - Estimate (2022): 2,602
  - Density: 1,005.5/sq mi (388.21/km^{2})
- Time zone: UTC−6 (Central (CST))
  - Summer (DST): UTC−5 (CDT)
- ZIP code: 56572
- Area code: 218
- FIPS code: 27-50164
- GNIS feature ID: 2396173
- Website: pelicanrapids.com

Pelican Rapids is a city in Otter Tail County, Minnesota, United States. The population was 2,577 at the 2020 census.

== History ==
Pelican Rapids was platted in 1872, and named for the rapids on the Pelican River. A post office has been in operation at Pelican Rapids since 1872. Pelican Rapids was incorporated in 1882.

== Geography ==
According to the United States Census Bureau, the city has an area of 2.63 square miles (6.81 km^{2}), of which 2.53 square miles (6.55 km^{2}) is land and 0.10 square miles (0.26 km^{2}) is water.

U.S. Highway 59 and Minnesota State Highway 108 are two of the main routes in the city.

== Culture ==
Local landmarks include "Pelican Pete", a sculpture constructed beside the river in 1957 that is claimed to be the world's largest statue of a pelican. It stands 15.4-foot (4.7 m) tall and is constructed from concrete and plaster. A survey of the state's architecture by the University of Minnesota Press calls Pelican Pete an "effective programmatic advertisement for the town, just eye-catching and outrageous enough to attract considerable attention."

In 2007, for the 50th anniversary of Pelican Pete's installation, the town launched a painted statue public art project wherein about three dozen smaller, 4-foot (1.2 m) pelican sculptures were placed around town and decorated by local artists.

The O.A.E. Blyberg House is listed on the National Register of Historic Places.

== Demographics ==
Historical population
Census	Pop.	Note	%±
1890	624		—
1900	1,033		65.5%
1910	1,019		−1.4%
1920	1,156		13.4%
1930	1,365		18.1%
1940	1,560		14.3%
1950	1,676		7.4%
1960	1,693		1.0%
1970	1,835		8.4%
1980	1,867		1.7%
1990	1,886		1.0%
2000	2,374		25.9%
2010	2,464		3.8%
2020	2,577		4.6%
2022 (est.)	2,602		1.0%
U.S. Decennial Census; 2020 Census

=== 2020 census ===
As of the 2020 census, Pelican Rapids had a population of 2,577. The median age was 34.8 years. 30.4% of residents were under the age of 18 and 15.7% of residents were 65 years of age or older. For every 100 females there were 96.0 males, and for every 100 females age 18 and over there were 95.4 males age 18 and over.

0.0% of residents lived in urban areas, while 100.0% lived in rural areas.

There were 892 households in Pelican Rapids, of which 37.0% had children under the age of 18 living in them. Of all households, 45.2% were married-couple households, 20.2% were households with a male householder and no spouse or partner present, and 28.6% were households with a female householder and no spouse or partner present. About 29.8% of all households were made up of individuals and 16.2% had someone living alone who was 65 years of age or older.

There were 1,007 housing units, of which 11.4% were vacant. The homeowner vacancy rate was 1.5% and the rental vacancy rate was 11.9%.

Racial composition as of the 2020 census
Race	Number	Percent
White	1,240	48.1%
Black or African American	415	16.1%
American Indian and Alaska Native	28	1.1%
Asian	94	3.6%
Native Hawaiian and Other Pacific Islander	0	0.0%
Some other race	555	21.5%
Two or more races	245	9.5%
Hispanic or Latino (of any race)	851	33.0%

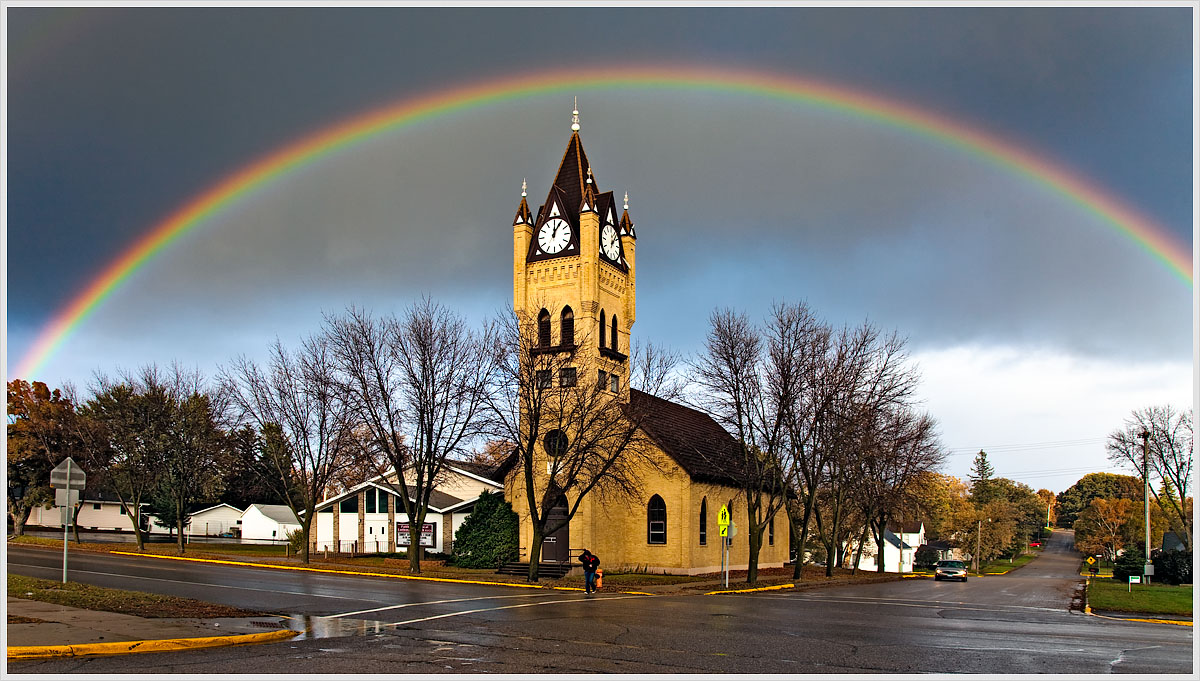
Rainbow at Faith Lutheran Church in Pelican Rapids

=== 2010 census ===
As of the census of 2010, there were 2,464 people, 904 households, and 569 families living in the city. The population density was 973.9 inhabitants per square mile (376.0/km^{2}). There were 984 housing units at an average density of 388.9 per square mile (150.2/km^{2}). The racial makeup of the city was 74.1% White, 5.8% African American, 0.9% Native American, 3.2% Asian, 0.7% Pacific Islander, 11.6% from other races, and 3.7% from two or more races. Hispanic or Latino of any race were 31.5% of the population.

There were 904 households, of which 36.0% had children under the age of 18 living with them, 46.5% were married couples living together, 11.0% had a female householder with no husband present, 5.5% had a male householder with no wife present, and 37.1% were non-families. 33.0% of all households were made up of individuals, and 19% had someone living alone who was 65 years of age or older. The average household size was 2.66 and the average family size was 3.42.

The median age in the city was 35.4 years. 28.6% of residents were under the age of 18; 9.2% were between the ages of 18 and 24; 23.9% were from 25 to 44; 21.1% were from 45 to 64; and 17.1% were 65 years of age or older. The gender makeup of the city was 49.6% male and 50.4% female.

=== 2000 census ===
As of the census of 2000, there were 2,374 people, 884 households, and 558 families living in the city. The population density was 905.8 inhabitants per square mile (349.7/km^{2}). There were 962 housing units at an average density of 367.0 per square mile (141.7/km^{2}). The racial makeup of the city was 60.43% White, 0.72% African American, 1.93% Native American, 1.58% Asian, 1.04% Pacific Islander, 6.76% from other races, and 4.54% from two or more races. Hispanic or Latino of any race were 23.59% of the population.

There were 884 households, out of which 33.1% had children under the age of 18 living with them, 50.3% were married couples living together, 7.7% had a female householder with no husband present, and 36.8% were non-families. 33.5% of all households were made up of individuals, and 19.2% had someone living alone who was 65 years of age or older. The average household size was 2.57 and the average family size was 3.31.

In the city, the population was spread out, with 27.6% under the age of 18, 8.7% from 18 to 24, 25.2% from 25 to 44, 17.4% from 45 to 64, and 21.1% who were 65 years of age or older. The median age was 36 years. For every 100 females, there were 97.2 males. For every 100 females age 18 and over, there were 94.6 males.

The median income for a household in the city was $27,232, and the median income for a family was $36,970. Males had a median income of $23,750 versus $20,645 for females. The per capita income for the city was $13,699. About 9.5% of families and 15.8% of the population were below the poverty line, including 20.4% of those under age 18 and 18.7% of those age 65 or over.

== Politics ==
Presidential election results

2020 Precinct Results Spreadsheet2016 Precinct Results Spreadsheet2012 Precinct Results Spreadsheet2008 Precinct Results Spreadsheet2004 Precinct Results Spreadsheet2000 Precinct Results Spreadsheet
Year	Republican	Democratic	Third parties
2020	47.8% 437	50.2% 459	2.0% 19
2016	44.8% 366	48.3% 395	6.9% 56
2012	42.7% 346	54.9% 445	2.4% 19
2008	41.8% 362	54.6% 472	3.6% 31
2004	60.5% 531	38.2% 335	1.3% 12
2000	54.5% 463	38.4% 326	7.1% 60

== Notable people ==
- Roy Emery Dunn - businessman and politician
- Dave Goltz - Major League Baseball pitcher
- Roger L. Hanson - businessman and politician
- Tucker Hibbert - professional snowmobile racer
- Buck Paulson - painter with a show on PBS
