= Nathan Wesenberg =

American politician and biologist

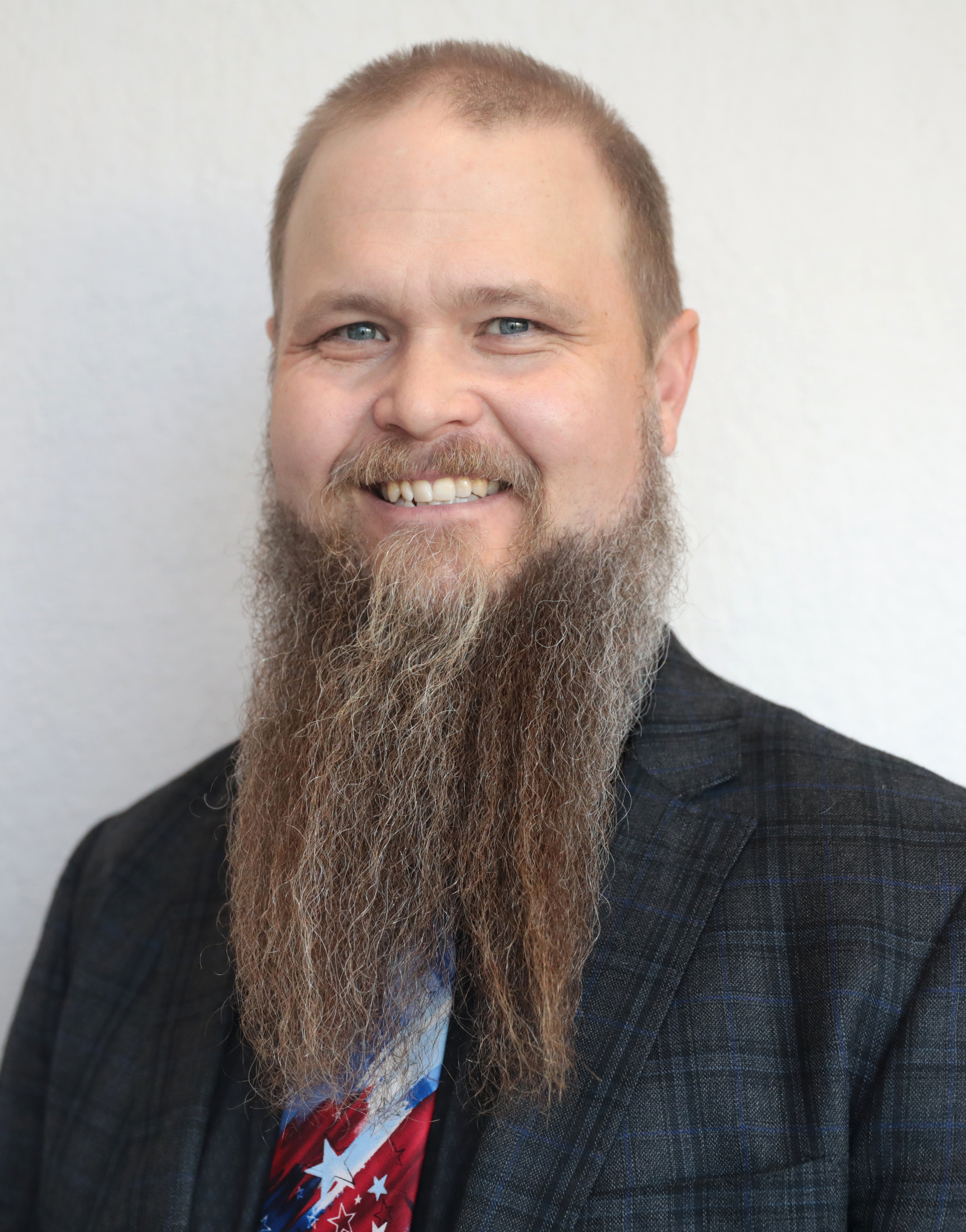

Member of the Minnesota Senate from the 10th district
- Incumbent
- Assumed office January 3, 2023
- Preceded by: Carrie Ruud

Personal details
- Born: Little Falls, Minnesota, U.S.
- Party: Republican
- Children: 3
- Education: St. Cloud State University

Nathan Wesenberg (/ˈwiːsənbərɡ/ WEE-sən-bərg) is an American politician serving since 2023 in the Minnesota Senate. A member of the Republican Party of Minnesota, he represents Senate district 10.

== Career ==
Before entering politics, Wesenberg worked as a wildlife biologist at the Minnesota Department of Natural Resources. He was also a conservative activist in Morrison County, Minnesota. Wesenberg's Senate campaign was supported by Action 4 Liberty, a libertarian-leaning activist organization. Wesenberg was elected in 2022 and took office on January 3, 2023.

== Political positions ==
On March 17, 2025, Wesenberg was one of the five Republican authors of a bill, SF2589, that would make "Trump Derangement Syndrome" an officially recognized mental illness in Minnesota. The bill raised concerns about the politicization of mental health diagnoses, which could be used to misappropriate care, diminish other mental health concerns, and suppress dissent and political expression.

== COVID vaccines ==
In January 2023, Wesenberg spoke at an anti-COVID vaccine rally held at the state capitol. He said Governor Tim Walz should be jailed for his response to the pandemic and called the COVID-19 vaccine a "death shot". Wesenberg also said his wife had recently left her job as a doctor because her employer disapproved of her writing exemptions for masks and vaccines.
