= Gene R. Wenstrom =

American politician

Member of the Minnesota House of Representatives from the 11A district
- In office 1975–1978
- Preceded by: Cal Larson

Personal details
- Born: November 27, 1946 (age 79) Fergus Falls, Minnesota, U.S.
- Party: Democratic-Farmer-Labor
- Education: Fergus Falls Community College; Moorhead State University

Gene R. Wenstrom (born November 27, 1946) is an American politician. He served as a member for the 11A district of the Minnesota House of Representatives.

== Life and career ==
Wenstrom was born in Fergus Falls, Minnesota. He attended Fergus Falls Community College and Moorhead State University.

Wenstrom served in the Minnesota House of Representatives from 1975 to 1978.
