= Ben Omann =

American farmer, insurance agent, and politician

Bernard P. "Ben" Omann, Sr. (June 1, 1919 – November 19, 1986) was an American farmer, insurance agent, and politician.

From St. Joseph, Minnesota, Omann went to Saint John's Preparatory School. Omann was a farmer and was the owner of Omann Insurance Agency. Omann served in the Minnesota Senate in 1980 after being elected in a special election. He was a Republican. Omann then served in the Minnesota House of Representatives from 1983 until his death in 1986. Omann died from cancer in a hospital in St. Cloud, Minnesota. His son Bernie Omann also served in the Minnesota Legislature.
