= Walter Franz (politician) =

American politician

Walter "W.J." Franz

Member of the Minnesota Senate from the 10th and 18th district
- In office January 4, 1955 – January 4, 1971
- Preceded by: Bjarne Elgar Grottum
- Succeeded by: Howard Olson

Personal details
- Born: January 30, 1907 Mountain Lake, Minnesota
- Died: January 17, 1985 (aged 77) Mountain Lake, Minnesota
- Party: Republican
- Education: University of Minnesota
- Occupation: business owner, legislator

Walter "Walt" or "W.J." Franz (January 30, 1907 – January 17, 1985) was a Minnesota politician and a member of the Minnesota Senate from southwestern Minnesota.

Franz was first elected in 1954 when he succeeded retiring Senator Bjarne Elgar Grottum of Jackson, and was re-elected in 1958, 1962 and 1966. He represented the old districts 10 and 18, which included all or portions of Cottonwood, Jackson and Watonwan counties, changing somewhat through redistricting in 1960.

From the city of Mountain Lake, Franz was a local businessman, owning and operating a general store. Prior to being elected to the senate, he served as a Cottonwood County Commissioner from 1941 to 1955, and as Mountain Lake Village Clerk from 1937 to 1941.

As senator, Franz allied with the Conservative Caucus at a time when the legislature was still officially nonpartisan, although he identified as and was known to be a Republican. He served on the Senate Elections & Reapportionment, Labor, Liquor Control, Public Highways, Public Welfare, Rules & Legislative Expense, Taxes & Tax Laws, Temperance & Liquor Control, Towns & Counties committees, and on various other committee incarnations and subcommittees during his 16 years in office.

Franz was chair of the Senate's Public Welfare Committee from 1963 to 1971, and was also president pro tempore from 1969 to 1971. He was appointed to and served on the Minnesota Statehood Centennial Commission during 1957–1958, and on the Minnesota Commission on the Problems of Mentally Retarded, Handicapped and Gifted Children from 1963 to 1969.

After leaving the senate in 1971, Franz continued to run his business in Mountain Lake. He died in 1985.
