= Nathaniel Tefft =

American physician and politician (1832–1905)

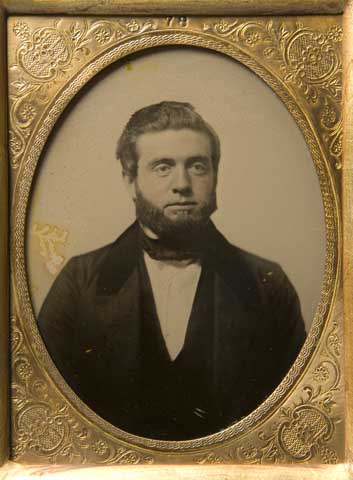
- Tefft c. 1857

Member of the Minnesota Senate from the 10th District
- In office January 3, 1871 – January 1, 1872
- Preceded by: W.S. Jackson
- Succeeded by: O.S. Porter

Member of the Minnesota House of Representatives from the 10th District
- In office January 8, 1861 – January 6, 1862

Member of the Minnesota House of Representatives from the 12th District
- In office December 2, 1857 – December 6, 1859

Personal details
- Born: Nathaniel Stancy Tefft; July 16, 1832 Hamilton, New York
- Died: January 21, 1905 (aged 72) Plainview, Minnesota, U.S.

Nathaniel Stancy Tefft (July 16, 1832 – January 21, 1905) was an American physician and politician in Minnesota. Tefft served two nonconsecutive terms in the Minnesota House of Representatives and one term in the Minnesota Senate.

== Early life and education ==
Tefft was born on July 16, 1832, in Hamilton, New York.^{:983} Tefft was educated in Fredonia, Mayville, and Panama, before studying medicine in 1848 under Dr. James Fenner of Sherman, New York.^{:983} Tefft's family later moved to Ohio where he studied medicine in Cincinnati in 1851 and 1852, before moving back to Sherman, New York where he practiced medicine for four years.^{:983}

== Medical career ==
Tefft eventually moved to Minnesota Territory in 1856 and settled in Minneiska, Minnesota in Wabasha County.^{:983} Tefft practiced medicine in Minneiska beginning in 1856, until moving to Plainview, Minnesota in 1861, where he continued his practice.^{:57} Tefft later served as the county physician of Wabasha County, Minnesota in 1882.^{:983}

== Political career ==
=== Local offices ===
Tefft began his political career upon moving to Minnesota where he held the local offices of both justice of the peace and postmaster of Minneiska.^{:983}

=== Minnesota House ===
Tefft first ran for statewide office in 1857 for a seat in the Minnesota House of Representatives representing Minnesota's 12th House district. At the time the district consisted of only Wabasha County. Tefft won the October 13, 1857, election and served in the 1st Minnesota Legislature, which was a protracted session, from December 2, 1857, to December 6, 1859. During his first term, Tefft was a member of the agriculture and manufactures committee.

Tefft ran again in 1860 for a seat in the Minnesota House, this time representing Minnesota's 10th House district. Tefft won the November 6, 1860, election and would serve during the 3rd Minnesota Legislature from January 8, 1861, to January 6, 1862. During his second term in the Minnesota House, Tifft was a member of the ways and means committee and education committee, and was the chair of the elections committee.

=== Minnesota Senate ===
Tefft later campaigned in 1870 for a seat in the Minnesota Senate representing Minnesota's 10th Senate district as part of the Union Labor Party. Tefft won the November 8, 1870, election against the incumbent, William S. Jackson, winning a total of 54.51% of the vote with a margin of +9.03%. Tefft served in the 13th Minnesota Legislature from January 3, 1871, to January 1, 1872. During his term in the Minnesota Senate, Tefft was a member of the printing committee and state charitable institutions committee, and was the chairman of the enrollment and public lands committees.

Tefft ran unsuccessfully in 1874 for a seat in Minnesota's 15th Senate district. Tefft lost the November 3, 1874, election to J. Edward Doughty of the Opposition Party. Tefft won only 34.37% of the vote and lost to Doughty by a margin of 31.27%.

== Later life and death ==
Tefft was the chairman and a member of the Greenwood Prairie Old Settlers' Association.^{:67} Tefft was heavily involved in the Independent Order of Odd Fellows in Minnesota where he was elected as the state's deputy grand master on June 5, 1883.^{:983}

Tefft died on January 21, 1905, in Plainview, Minnesota.

== Personal life ==
Tefft was married to Hattie S. Gibbs of Plainview, Minnesota on November 10, 1866, together they had one child.^{:984}
