= James C. Day =

American politician and soldier (1822–1911)

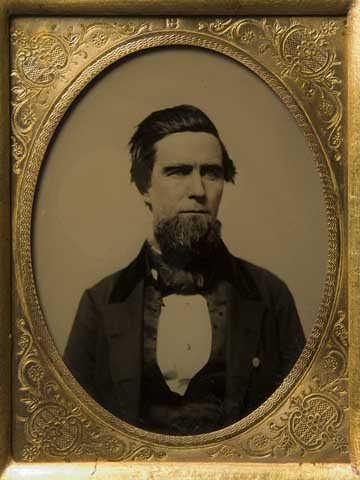
- Day c. 1858

Member of the Minnesota Senate from the 10th District
- In office December 2, 1857 – December 6, 1859 Serving with Oscar W. Streeter
- Governor: Samuel Medary
- Preceded by: Position established
- Succeeded by: Fred Gluck; E.H. Kennedy

County Commissioner of Houston County, Minnesota
- In office 1857–1858

Personal details
- Born: January 30, 1822 Fayette County, Pennsylvania, U.S.
- Died: February 8, 1911 (aged 89) San Jose, California, U.S.
- Resting place: Oak Hill Memorial Park
- Other political affiliations: Democrat

Military service
- Allegiance: United States
- Branch/service: United States Army
- Years of service: 1847–1848
- Unit: 1st Missouri Volunteers
- Battles/wars: Mexican-American War

James C. Day (January 30, 1822 – February 8, 1911), sometimes abbreviated as J.C. Day, was an American politician, soldier, businessman, and early citizen of La Crosse, Wisconsin and Houston County, Minnesota. Day served a single term in Minnesota Legislature during the 1st Minnesota Legislature as a member of the Minnesota Senate representing Minnesota's 10th Senate district.

== Early life ==
Day was born on January 30, 1822, in Fayette County, Pennsylvania, he was the son of James Day and Margaret Devinna. In 1842 Day moved to Wisconsin Territory and settled in La Crosse, Wisconsin where he worked as a lumberjack on the Black River until 1843. In 1843 Day briefly moved to Rock Island, Illinois until 1846 when he moved back to La Crosse.^{:564} In 1847 during the Mexican–American War, Day joined the United States Army and served with Company E of the 1st Missouri Volunteers. In 1849 following the conflict Day moved back to Pennsylvania.

Beginning in 1855 Day moved to Minnesota Territory and settled in La Crescent, Minnesota in Houston County, Minnesota. Day later moved to Mound Prairie Township in Houston County in 1855 where he owned a farm.

== Politics ==
Day began his political career in 1857 as a member of the Minnesota Democratic Constitutional Convention from the 8th District which helped ratify the Minnesota Constitution.^{:73}^{:61} The 8th District at the time included the counties of Houston, Fillmore, and Mower.^{:43}^{:789} Day and Oscar W. Streeter were later elected as representatives of Minnesota's 10th Senate district on October 13, 1857.^{:790} Day would serve in the Minnesota Senate from December 2, 1857, to December 6, 1859. During his term, Day was the chairman of the Internal Improvements Committee and served on the Credentials and Education and Sciences Committees. During this time Day also served as a county commissioner for Houston County from 1857 to 1858.^{:99}

== Later life and death ==
Following his term in the Minnesota Legislature, Day worked in La Crescent where he owned and operated a steamboat ferry along with Mississippi River and offered ferrying services from La Crescent to La Crosse. Day also operated a dry goods store in Austin, Minnesota.^{:204-205} In 1859 Day took part in the Pike's Peak gold rush in Nebraska Territory. Day eventually moved to San Jose, California in 1884 where he owned a 10-acre ranch and fruit orchard.

Day died on February 8, 1911, in San Jose, he is buried in Oak Hill Memorial Park.

== Personal life ==
Day was married to Hannah McClaren in Pennsylvania in February, 1849, together they had four daughters.
