= Minnesota's 10th Senate district =

American legislative district

Minnesota's 10th State Senate district
Senator
Nathan Wesenberg; R–Little Falls
since 2023
- Population (2020): 86,979

The Minnesota Senate, District 10, is in north-central Minnesota. It is currently represented by Republican Nathan Wesenberg.

== List of senators ==
Session	Senator	Party	Term start	Term end	Home	Location	
1st		James C. Day	Dem	December 2, 1857	December 6, 1859	La Crescent	Houston
1st		Oscar W. Streeter	Dem	December 2, 1857	December 6, 1859	?	Houston
2nd		Fred Gluck	Non	December 7, 1859	January 7, 1861	Brownsville	Houston
2nd		E.H. Kennedy	Non	December 7, 1859	January 7, 1861	Houston	Houston
3rd		John H. Pell	Non	January 8, 1861	May 29, 1861	Plainview	Wabasha
3rd		vacant		May 29, 1861	January 2, 1862		Wabasha
3rd		Linus Richards	Rep	January 2, 1862	January 5, 1863	Reeds Landing	Wabasha
4th		Linus Richards	Rep	January 2, 1862	January 5, 1863	Reeds Landing	Wabasha
5th		R. Ottman	Non	January 6, 1863	January 2, 1865	Lake City	Wabasha
6th		R. Ottman	Non	January 6, 1863	January 2, 1865	Lake City	Wabasha
7th		Melville C. Smith	Non	January 3, 1865	January 7, 1867	Lake City	Wabasha
7th		N.F. Randolph	Non	January 3, 1865	January 7, 1867	Lake City	Wabasha
8th		N.F. Randolph	Non	January 3, 1865	January 7, 1867	Lake City	Wabasha
9th		J.L. Armstrong	Rep	January 8, 1867	January 4, 1869	Lake City	Wabasha
10th		J.L. Armstrong	Rep	January 8, 1867	January 4, 1869	Lake City	Wabasha
11th		W.W. Prindle	Rep	January 5, 1869	January 2, 1871	Wabasha	Wabasha
11th		W.S. Jackson	Rep	January 5, 1869	January 2, 1871	Wabasha	Wabasha
12th		W.S. Jackson	Rep	January 5, 1869	January 2, 1871	Wabasha	Wabasha
13th		Nathaniel Tefft	Rep	January 3, 1871	January 1, 1872	Plainview	Wabasha
14th		O.S. Porter	Rep	January 2, 1872	January 5, 1874	Rochester	Olmsted
15th		O.S. Porter	Rep	January 2, 1872	January 5, 1874	Rochester	Olmsted
16th		Isaac M. Westfall	Non	January 6, 1874	January 3, 1876	Rochester	Olmsted
17th		Isaac M. Westfall	Non	January 6, 1874	January 3, 1876	Rochester	Olmsted
18th		John V. Daniels	Rep	January 4, 1876	October 11, 1881	Rochester	Olmsted
19th		John V. Daniels	Rep	January 4, 1876	October 11, 1881	Rochester	Olmsted
20th		John V. Daniels	Rep	January 4, 1876	October 11, 1881	Rochester	Olmsted
21st		Daniel A. Morrison	Rep	January 7, 1879?	January 1, 1883	Rochester	Olmsted
22nd		Daniel A. Morrison	Rep	January 7, 1879?	January 1, 1883	Rochester	Olmsted
23rd		Lafayette Gilbert Mortiere Fletcher	Non	January 2, 1883	January 3, 1887	Mankato	Blue Earth
24th		Lafayette Gilbert Mortiere Fletcher	Non	January 2, 1883	January 3, 1887	Mankato	Blue Earth
25th		Edmund Mann Pope	Dem	January 4, 1887	January 5, 1891	Mankato	Blue Earth
26th		Edmund Mann Pope	Dem	January 4, 1887	January 5, 1891	Mankato	Blue Earth
27th		George T. Barr	Rep	January 6, 1891	January 2, 1899	Mankato	Blue Earth
28th		George T. Barr	Rep	January 6, 1891	January 2, 1899	Mankato	Blue Earth
29th		George T. Barr	Rep	January 6, 1891	January 2, 1899	Mankato	Blue Earth
30th		George T. Barr	Rep	January 6, 1891	January 2, 1899	Mankato	Blue Earth
31st		Peter McGovern	Dem	January 3, 1899	January 5, 1903	Waseca	Waseca
32nd		Peter McGovern	Dem	January 3, 1899	January 5, 1903	Waseca	Waseca
33rd		Eugene Belnap Collester	Rep	January 6, 1903	January 7, 1907	Waseca	Waseca
34th		Eugene Belnap Collester	Rep	January 6, 1903	January 7, 1907	Waseca	Waseca
35th		John Moonan	Dem	January 8, 1907	January 4, 1915	Waseca	Waseca
36th		John Moonan	Dem	January 8, 1907	January 4, 1915	Waseca	Waseca
37th		John Moonan	Dem	January 8, 1907	January 4, 1915	Waseca	Waseca
38th		John Moonan	Dem	January 8, 1907	January 4, 1915	Waseca	Waseca
39th		Charles W. Gillam	Non	January 5, 1915	January 3, 1927	Windom	Cottonwood Jackson
40th		Charles W. Gillam	Non	January 5, 1915	January 3, 1927	Windom	Cottonwood Jackson
41st		Charles W. Gillam	Non	January 5, 1915	January 3, 1927	Windom	Cottonwood Jackson
42nd		Charles W. Gillam	Non	January 5, 1915	January 3, 1927	Windom	Cottonwood Jackson
43rd		Charles W. Gillam	Non	January 5, 1915	January 3, 1927	Windom	Cottonwood Jackson
44th		Charles W. Gillam	Non	January 5, 1915	January 3, 1927	Windom	Cottonwood Jackson
45th		Moses L. Frost	Non	January 4, 1927	January 5, 1931	Jackson	Cottonwood Jackson
46th		Moses L. Frost	Non	January 4, 1927	January 5, 1931	Jackson	Cottonwood Jackson
47th		Ole J. Finstad	Non	January 6, 1931	January 6, 1947	Windom	Cottonwood Jackson
48th		Ole J. Finstad	Non	January 6, 1931	January 6, 1947	Windom	Cottonwood Jackson
49th		Ole J. Finstad	Non	January 6, 1931	January 6, 1947	Windom	Cottonwood Jackson
50th		Ole J. Finstad	Non	January 6, 1931	January 6, 1947	Windom	Cottonwood Jackson
51st		Ole J. Finstad	Non	January 6, 1931	January 6, 1947	Windom	Cottonwood Jackson
52nd		Ole J. Finstad	Non	January 6, 1931	January 6, 1947	Windom	Cottonwood Jackson
53rd		Ole J. Finstad	Non	January 6, 1931	January 6, 1947	Windom	Cottonwood Jackson
54th		Ole J. Finstad	Non	January 6, 1931	January 6, 1947	Windom	Cottonwood Jackson
55th		Bjarne Elgar Grottum	Lib	January 7, 1947	January 3, 1955	Jackson	Cottonwood Jackson
56th		Bjarne Elgar Grottum	Lib	January 7, 1947	January 3, 1955	Jackson	Cottonwood Jackson
57th		Bjarne Elgar Grottum	Con	January 7, 1947	January 3, 1955	Jackson	Cottonwood Jackson
58th		Bjarne Elgar Grottum	Con	January 7, 1947	January 3, 1955	Jackson	Cottonwood Jackson
59th		Walter Franz	Con	January 6, 1955	January 7, 1963	Mountain Lake	Cottonwood Jackson Watowan
60th		Walter Franz	Con	January 6, 1955	January 7, 1963	Mountain Lake	Cottonwood Jackson Watowan
61st		Walter Franz	Con	January 6, 1955	January 7, 1963	Mountain Lake	Cottonwood Jackson Watowan
62nd		Walter Franz	Con	January 6, 1955	January 7, 1963	Mountain Lake	Cottonwood Jackson Watowan
63rd		Ernest Anderson	Con	January 8, 1963	January 1, 1973	Frost	Faribault Martin
64th		Ernest Anderson	Con	January 8, 1963	January 1, 1973	Frost	Faribault Martin
65th		Ernest Anderson	Con	January 8, 1963	January 1, 1973	Frost	Faribault Martin
66th		Ernest Anderson	Con	January 8, 1963	January 1, 1973	Frost	Faribault Martin
67th		Ernest Anderson	Con	January 8, 1963	January 1, 1973	Frost	Faribault Martin
68th		Roger L. Hanson	Con	January 2, 1973	January 3, 1977	Vergas	Becker Otter Tail Wadena
69th		Roger L. Hanson	Con	January 2, 1973	January 3, 1977	Vergas	Becker Otter Tail Wadena
70th		Collin Peterson	DFL	January 4, 1977	January 5, 1987	Detroit Lakes	Becker Otter Tail Wadena
71st		Collin Peterson	DFL	January 4, 1977	January 5, 1987	Detroit Lakes	Becker Otter Tail Wadena
72nd		Collin Peterson	DFL	January 4, 1977	January 5, 1987	Detroit Lakes	Becker Otter Tail Wadena
73rd		Collin Peterson	DFL	January 4, 1977	January 5, 1987	Detroit Lakes	Becker Otter Tail Wadena
74th		Collin Peterson	DFL	January 4, 1977	January 5, 1987	Detroit Lakes	Becker Otter Tail Wadena
75th		Cal Larson	Rep	January 6, 1987	January 2, 2007	Fergus Falls	Becker Otter Tail Wadena
76th		Cal Larson	Rep	January 6, 1987	January 2, 2007	Fergus Falls	Becker Otter Tail Wadena
77th		Cal Larson	Rep	January 6, 1987	January 2, 2007	Fergus Falls	Becker Otter Tail Wadena
78th		Cal Larson	Rep	January 6, 1987	January 2, 2007	Fergus Falls	Becker Otter Tail Wadena
79th		Cal Larson	Rep	January 6, 1987	January 2, 2007	Fergus Falls	Becker Otter Tail Wadena
80th		Cal Larson	Rep	January 6, 1987	January 2, 2007	Fergus Falls	Becker Otter Tail Wadena
81st		Cal Larson	Rep	January 6, 1987	January 2, 2007	Fergus Falls	Becker Otter Tail Wadena
82nd		Cal Larson	Rep	January 6, 1987	January 2, 2007	Fergus Falls	Becker Otter Tail Wadena
83rd		Cal Larson	Rep	January 6, 1987	January 2, 2007	Fergus Falls	Becker Otter Tail Wadena
84th		Cal Larson	Rep	January 6, 1987	January 2, 2007	Fergus Falls	Becker Otter Tail Wadena
85th		Dan Skogen	DFL	January 3, 2007	January 3, 2011	Hewitt	Becker Otter Tail Wadena
86th		Dan Skogen	DFL	January 3, 2007	January 3, 2011	Hewitt	Becker Otter Tail Wadena
87th		Gretchen Hoffman	Rep	January 4, 2011	January 7, 2013	Vergas	Becker Otter Tail Wadena
88th		Carrie Ruud	Rep	January 8, 2013	January 3, 2023	Breezy Point	Aitkin Crow Wing
89th		Carrie Ruud	Rep	January 8, 2013	January 3, 2023	Breezy Point	Aitkin Crow Wing
90th		Carrie Ruud	Rep	January 8, 2013	January 3, 2023	Breezy Point	Aitkin Crow Wing
91st		Carrie Ruud	Rep	January 8, 2013	January 3, 2023	Breezy Point	Aitkin Crow Wing
92nd		Nathan Wesenberg	Rep	January 3, 2023	Incumbent	Little Falls	Aitkin Crow Wing
93rd		Nathan Wesenberg	Rep	January 3, 2023	Incumbent	Little Falls	Aitkin Crow Wing
94th		Nathan Wesenberg	Rep	January 3, 2023	Incumbent	Little Falls	Aitkin Crow Wing
