= Ole J. Finstad =

American politician

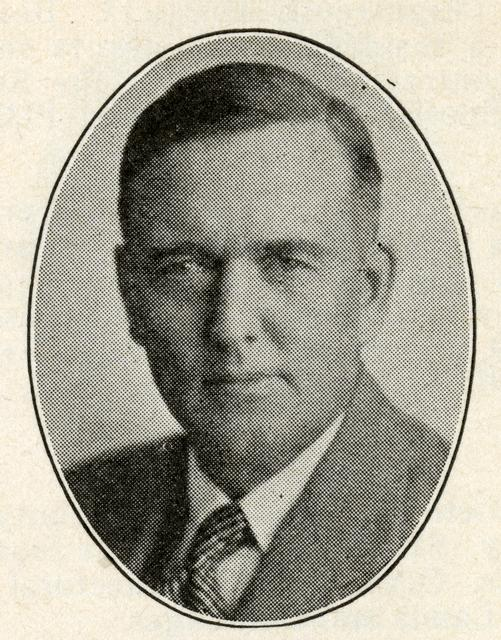

Member of the Minnesota Senate from the 10th district
- In office 1931–1946
- Preceded by: Moses L. Frost
- Succeeded by: Bjarne Elgar Grottum

Personal details
- Born: March 29, 1878 Avoca, Minnesota
- Died: February 7, 1960 (aged 81) Windom, Minnesota
- Party: Nonpartisan
- Spouse: Mabel Sheets
- Education: University of Minnesota Law School
- Profession: Lawyer, legislator

Ole J. Finstad (March 29, 1878 – February 7, 1960) was a state senator and lawyer from Windom, Minnesota. He served in the Minnesota Senate from 1931 to 1946.

== Personal life ==
Finstad was born in 1878 on a farm near Avoca in Murray County, Minnesota. When he was two or three years old, his mother died so he was raised in Christiania Township south of Windom, Minnesota by a Johnson family. He married Mabel Sheets (1882–1958) on April 7, 1906. He died on February 7, 1960, less than two years after the passing of his wife on November 23, 1958. His funeral occurred on February 10 at the Methodist church in Windom.

== Education ==
Finstad attended elementary school in Delafield Township and high school in the Windom public school system. He attended college at the University of Minnesota Law School and received his law degree on June 4, 1903.

== Non-government employment ==
Finstad was admitted to the Minnesota State Bar Association on June 5, 1903. From then until his 1959 retirement he practiced in the City of Windom. He also worked as a school teacher.

== Government service ==
Finstad served in the Minnesota Senate from 1931 to 1946. He served in the 47th–54th Minnesota Legislatures in District 10. Finstad was preceded by Moses Frost and succeeded by Bjarne Elgar Grottum. He also served on the School board in Windom, as a County attorney for Cottonwood County, and as a member of the Minnesota State Historical Society.
