= Senator Olsen =

Senator Olsen may refer to:

- Alan Olsen (born 1947), Oregon State Senate
- Andrea Olsen (born 1961), Montana State Senate
- Jared Olsen (born 1987), Wyoming State Senate
- Luther Olsen (born 1951), Wisconsin State Senate

== See also ==
- Rick Olseen (born 1956), Minnesota State Senate
- Senator Olson (disambiguation)
