= Oscar W. Streeter =

American lawyer and politician (1821–1902)

- Streeter c. 1857

Enumerator for the United States Census Bureau
- In office June 1, 1860 – November 1860
- Appointed by: James Buchanan

Member of the Minnesota Senate from the 10th District
- In office December 2, 1857 – December 6, 1859 Serving with James C. Day
- Preceded by: Position established
- Succeeded by: Fred Gluck

Personal details
- Born: Oscar Willard Streeter; 1821 Syracuse, New York, U.S.
- Died: December 16, 1902 (aged 80–81) Superior, Wisconsin, U.S.
- Resting place: Caledonia Cemetery; Caledonia, Minnesota, U.S.
- Other political affiliations: Democrat

Oscar Willard Streeter (1821 – December 16, 1902), sometimes abbreviated as O. W. Streeter, was an American lawyer, politician, and early citizen of Houston County, Minnesota. Streeter was most notably involved in the United States v. Stinson squatting case, which became one of the largest property fraud cases in the history Superior, Wisconsin.

== Early life and career ==
Streeter was born in 1821 in Syracuse, New York. Streeter briefly lived in Galena, Illinois, where he practiced law before moving to Beetown, Wisconsin in 1847. While in Wisconsin, Streeter actively campaigned for Nelson Dewey during the 1848 Wisconsin gubernatorial election.

In 1850 Streeter settled in Center Township in Allamakee County, Iowa, where he built the township's first house.^{:228} In 1854 Streeter sold his assets in Iowa^{:228} and moved to Minnesota Territory choosing to settle in the city of Brownsville, Minnesota where he was elected as the town's accessor.^{:332} While in Brownsville, Streeter owned a store which he operated alongside Samuel McPhail.^{:350,356}

== Political career ==
From July 13, 1857, to August 29, 1857, Streeter served as a delegate of the Minnesota Territorial Democratic Constitutional Convention which ratified the Minnesota Constitution. On October 13, 1857, Streeter was elected to the Minnesota Legislature along with James C. Day representing Minnesota's 10th Senate district.^{:307} At the time Minnesota's 10th Senate district included Houston County, Minnesota. Streeter would serve in the 1st Minnesota Legislature from December 2, 1857, to December 6, 1859. During his term Streeter was the chair of the incorporations committee, and was a member of the ways and means committee and banks committee.

In 1860 Streeter was appointed by President of the United States, James Buchanan as a special census agent for the United States government for the 1860 United States census. During the census Streeter was tasked with taking census information in all of the United States' unorganized territories, including Washington Territory (now Montana) and the Dakotas.

== Later life ==
In the 1890s Streeter became involved in the United States v. Stinson, a squatting case, as an associate attorney of Thomas Ewing Jr.. Streeter died on December 16, 1902, in Superior, Wisconsin. Streeter is buried in Caledonia, Minnesota.

== Personal life ==
Streeter was married to Geraldine Paddock in 1848 in Beetown, Wisconsin.
