= Dan Skogen =

American politician

Member of the Minnesota Senate from the 10th district
- In office January 3, 2007 – January 3, 2011
- Preceded by: Cal Larson
- Succeeded by: Gretchen Hoffman

Personal details
- Born: December 14, 1957 (age 68) Fergus Falls, Minnesota
- Party: Minnesota Democratic-Farmer-Labor Party
- Spouse: Dee
- Children: 2
- Education: Thief River Falls Technical College
- Profession: radio broadcaster, farmer, legislator

Dan Skogen (born December 14, 1957) is an American politician and a former member of the Minnesota Senate who represented District 10, which includes all or parts of Becker, Otter Tail, and Wadena Counties in the northwestern part of the state.

== Education and professional career ==
Skogen grew up near Phelps Mill in Maine Township. He graduated from Battle Lake High School and has an audio communications degree from Thief River Falls Technical College. He is the former sports director at radio stations in Wadena, and former Legislative Director for the Agricultural Utilization Research Institute. He resides near Hewitt with his wife, Dee, and has two children.

== Service in the Minnesota Senate ==
A Democrat, Skogen was first elected in 2006. He lost his reelection bid in 2010 to Republican Gretchen Hoffman. While in office, his special legislative concerns included the environment, agriculture, and education.

Skogen was a member of the Senate's Agriculture and Veterans Committee, the Commerce and Consumer Protection Committee, the Education Committee, and the Environment and Natural Resources Committee. He also served on and chaired the Environment and Natural Resources Subcommittee for Public Lands and Waters, and on the Finance subcommittees for the Agriculture and Veterans Budget and Policy Division and the E-12 Education Budget and Policy Division.

In 2012, Skogen ran for Minnesota Senate again in the redrawn Senate District 8 and lost to Bill Ingebrigtsen.

== Electoral history ==
2012 Minnesota State Senate District 8

- Bill Ingebrigtsen (R), 22,712 votes, 52.86%
- Dan Skogen (DFL), 20,213 votes, 47.04%

2010 Minnesota State Senate District 10

- Gretchen Hoffman (R), 17,048 votes, 54.79%
- Dan Skogen (DFL), 14,040 votes, 45.12%
- Write-In, 29 votes, 0.09%

2006 Minnesota State Senate District 10

- Cal Larson (R), 14,191 votes, 44.71%
- Dan Skogen (DFL), 17,530 votes, 55.23%
- Write-In, 18 votes, 0.06%

Preceded by Cal Larson	Minnesota Senate District 10; 2007–2011	Succeeded by Gretchen Hoffman
