= Carrie Ruud =

American politician

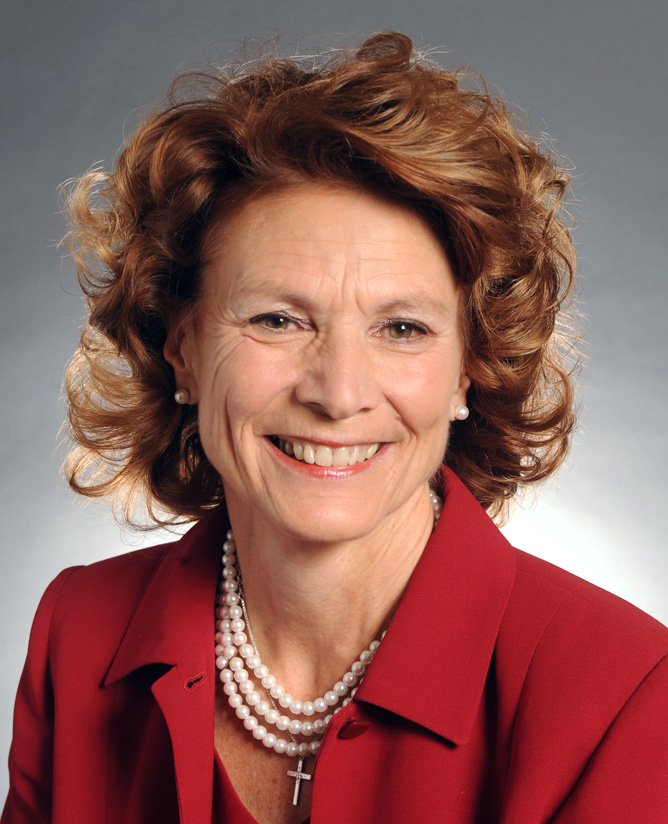
- Ruud in 2012

Member of the Minnesota Senate from the 10th district
- In office January 8, 2013 – January 11, 2022
- Preceded by: Gretchen Hoffman
- Succeeded by: Nathan Wesenberg

Member of the Minnesota Senate from the 4th district
- In office January 7, 2003 – January 2, 2007
- Preceded by: redrawn district
- Succeeded by: Mary Olson

Personal details
- Born: February 22, 1952 (age 74) St. Cloud, Minnesota
- Party: Republican
- Spouse: Dick Rostad (m. 2005)
- Children: 5
- Occupation: real estate broker, legislator

Carrie L. Ruud (/ruːd/ ROOD; born February 22, 1952) is a Minnesota politician who served in the Minnesota Senate from 2003 to 2007 and from 2013 to 2023. A member of the Republican Party of Minnesota, she represented District 10 in north-central Minnesota.

== Early life ==
Ruud was born in St. Cloud, Minnesota, and raised in Robbinsdale, Minnesota.

== Minnesota Senate ==
Ruud was first elected to the Minnesota Senate in 2003. She was defeated by Mary Olson in the 2006 election. She ran and was elected again in 2012. She did not run for reelection in 2022. From 2017 to 2023, Ruud chaired the Environment and Natural Resources Policy and Legacy Finance Committee.

== Personal life ==
Ruud is married to Dick Rostad. They have five children and reside in Breezy Point, Minnesota, where Ruud served as mayor from 2001 to 2002.
