= O.A.E. Blyberg House =

Historic house in Minnesota, United States

- U.S. National Register of Historic Places
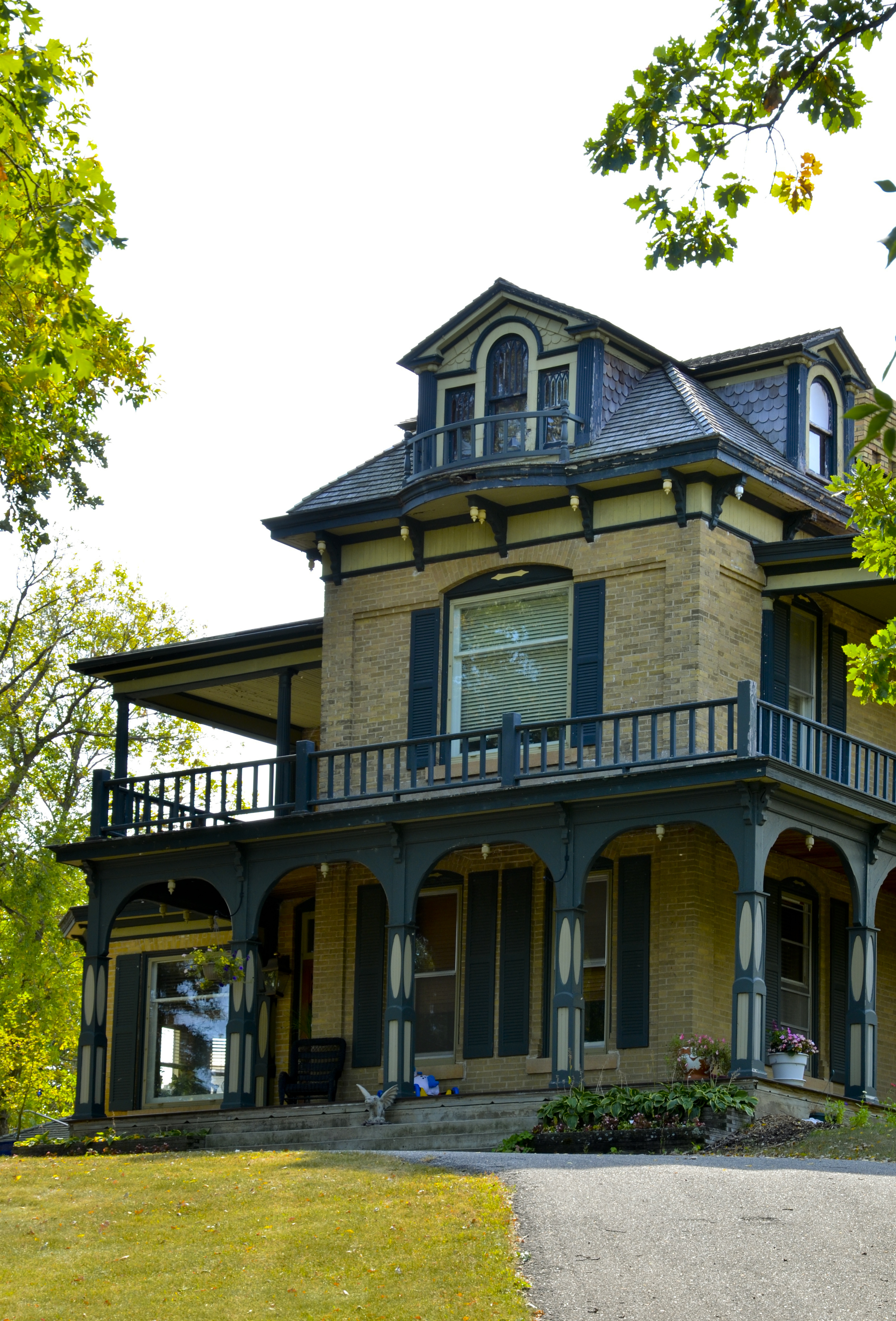

- Location within Minnesota Location within the United States
- Location: 22 5th Ave., SW; Pelican Rapids, Minnesota
- Coordinates: 46°33′51″N 96°05′05″W
- Area: less than one acre
- Built: 1884
- Architectural style: Italianate
- NRHP reference No.: 84001631
- Added to NRHP: February 16, 1984

The O.A.E. Blyberg House is a historic building located in Pelican Rapids, Minnesota, United States. Blyberg was a merchant and land speculator who settled here in 1871. He opened the first store in town and served as its first postmaster. His success is exemplified by this 2½-story brick residence that Blyberg had built in 1884 on a large tree-filled lot, and it remains one of the finest houses in town. The Italianate structure features an irregular plan, locally produced cream-colored brick, a low hipped roof with brackets and pendants, a wrap-around porch, and dressed stone window sills. The second story on the back of the house, the balconies on the east and west elevation, a single-story room on the east side, and the pedimented gabled dormers (except for the one on the north elevation) were added in a 1901-1902 renovation. The house was listed on the National Register of Historic Places in 1984.
