= Andrew C. Olson =

American politician

- 1913 portrait of Olson

Member of the Minnesota Senate from the 14th district
- In office 1911–1914
- Preceded by: Henry E. Hanson
- Succeeded by: Charles W. Gillam

Personal details
- Born: March 30, 1866 Winneshiek County, Iowa, U.S.
- Died: July 17, 1920 (aged 54) Windom, Minnesota, U.S.
- Party: Democratic
- Spouse: Julia Carolina Anton
- Profession: Farmer, legislator

Andrew C. Olson (March 30, 1866 – July 17, 1920) was a state senator for Minnesota's 14th district serving Cottonwood and Jackson counties.

Olson was born in Winneshiek County, Iowa. He was of Norwegian immigrant heritage. He moved with his parents Karl Olson and Ingeborg (Simonsdatter) Olson to Jackson County, Minnesota in 1868. He was educated at Minnesota Common Schools. He was a farmer with interests in a general store and grain elevator.

He served in the Minnesota Senate from 1911 to 1914. He was preceded by Henry Hanson and succeeded by Charles Gillam. In addition to his service as a senator, he served as a county commissioner of Jackson County.

== Personal life ==
He was married to Julia Carolina Anton Olson (1869–1923) on 13 December 1888 in Jackson County, the daughter of Norwegian immigrants Ole Anton and Merit (Johnson) Anton. Andrew and Julia Olson were the parents of eight children: Ella, Iva, Bert, Cyril, Marian, Earl, Grace, and Alvin. Both were buried at the Lakeview Cemetery in Cottonwood County, Minnesota.
