= Darrel Peterson =

American politician (1939–1994)

Member of the Minnesota Senate from the 27th and 29th district
- In office January 6, 1981 – January 5, 1987
- Preceded by: Howard Olson
- Succeeded by: Tracy Beckman

Member of the Minnesota House of Representatives from the 27B district
- In office January 7, 1975 – January 2, 1979
- Preceded by: Tom Hagedorn
- Succeeded by: David M. Jennings

Personal details
- Born: March 8, 1939 Fairmont, Minnesota, U.S.
- Died: February 3, 1994 (aged 54) Fairmont, Minnesota, U.S.
- Party: Republican
- Spouse(s): Sharon, Candace
- Children: 3
- Education: University of Minnesota (BS)
- Occupation: farmer, legislator

Darrel L. Peterson (March 8, 1939 – February 3, 1994) was a Minnesota politician and a member of the Minnesota House of Representatives and the Minnesota Senate.

== Background ==
Born in Fairmont, Minnesota, Peterson grew up and farmed in the area, graduating from East Chain High School and, later, the University of Minnesota, from which he earned a B.S. in Agriculture. Prior to running for the House and Senate, he had been a member of the Fairmont and the East Chain school boards.

== Service in the Minnesota House and Senate ==
A Republican, Peterson was first elected to the House in 1974, representing the old District 27B, and was re-elected in 1976. In 1980, he ran for the Senate, defeating incumbent Democrat Howard Olson. He was re-elected in 1982. He represented the old Senate districts 27 and 29, changing somewhat after the 1982 legislative redistricting. During his time in the legislature, he served all or portions of Blue Earth, Cottonwood, Faribault, Freeborn, Jackson, Martin, Nobles, Waseca and Watonwan counties in the southern part of the state.

Peterson was a member of the Commerce and Economic Development, Education, Health and Welfare, Labor-Management Relations, and Taxes committees in the House. Later, in the Senate, he was a member of the Education, Elections and Ethics, Energy and Housing, Judiciary, Public Utilities and State Regulated Industries, Taxes and Tax Laws committees. He also served on the Legislative Commission on Public Education.

While in the Senate, Peterson also served on the Education subcommittees for Education Aids, for Educational Operation and Governance and for Post-Secondary and Higher Education, of the Energy and Housing Subcommittee for Research and Alternative Financing, of the Judiciary subcommittees for Criminal Law and for Judicial Administration, of the Public Utilities and State Regulated Industries Subcommittee for Public Utilities, and of the Taxes and Tax Laws subcommittees for Agricultural Property Tax and for Natural Resources Tax. His special legislative concerns included education, agriculture, and job development.

== Appointment to Minnesota Public Utilities Commission ==
In 1986, Governor Rudy Perpich appointed Peterson to be a commissioner on the Minnesota Public Utilities Commission. He was a member of the commission until 1992, serving as its chair from 1990 to 1992.
