= Bernie Omann =

American politician from Minnesota

Bernard P. Omann, Jr. (born December 28, 1964) is an American farmer and politician.

From St. Joseph, Minnesota, Omann went to the Brainerd Community College. He received his bachelor's degree in political science from St. Cloud State University. He was a farmer. In 1987, Omann was elected to the Minnesota House of Representatives succeeding his father Ben Omann who died while in office. Omann was a Republican. Omann served in the Minnesota Legislature until 1992. He ran for the United States House of Representatives, as a Republican, in 1992 and 1994 and lost the elections. In 1997, he served as deputy chief of staff for Minnesota Governor Arne Carlson.
