= Howard Olson =

American politician

Member of the Minnesota Senate from the 18th and 27th district
- In office January 5, 1971 – January 5, 1981
- Preceded by: Walter J. Franz
- Succeeded by: Darrel Peterson

Personal details
- Born: August 25, 1937 Madelia, Minnesota, U.S.
- Died: November 23, 1996 St. James, Minnesota, U.S.
- Party: Democratic (DFL)
- Spouse: Coleen Skarpohl
- Children: 1
- Education: Minnesota State University, Mankato
- Occupation: Farmer, legislator

Howard D. Olson (August 25, 1937 – November 23, 1996) was a Minnesota politician and a member of the Minnesota Senate.

A Democrat, Olson was first elected in 1970, and was re-elected in 1972 and 1976. During his first six years, he caucused with the Liberal Caucus, as the Minnesota Legislature was officially nonpartisan until 1976. He represented the old districts 18 and 27, which changed somewhat through redistricting in 1972, and included all or portions of Cottonwood, Jackson, Martin, Nobles and Watonwan counties in the southwestern part of the state.

While in the Senate, Olson served on the Agriculture and Natural Resources, Health and Welfare, Local Government, Education, Rules and Administration, Taxes and Tax Laws, and Veterans' Affairs committees. He was also a member of the Natural Resources and Agriculture Subcommittee for Environmental Protection, of the Education subcommittees for Post-Secondary and Higher Education Planning and Coordination, for Special Education in State Institutions, and for Special Programs, and of the Taxes and Tax Laws Subcommittee for Sales and Property Tax.

Olson was chair of the General Legislation and Veterans Affairs Committee from 1977 to 1978, and of the General Legislation and Administrative Rules Committee from 1979 to 1980. He also chaired the Natural Resources and Agriculture Subcommittee for Agriculture from 1973 to 1976, and the Education Subcommittee for School Boards and Administration from 1975 to 1976. While in office, his special legislative concerns included agriculture, education, and the environment.

Born in the town of Madelia, Olson grew up and lived in St. James, attending St. James High School, from which he graduated in 1955, and Mankato State College in Mankato. He was a lifelong farmer in the area.
