= Roy Emery Dunn =

American politician (1886–1985)

Roy Emery Dunn (May 1, 1886 – July 23, 1985) was an American businessman and politician.

Dunn was born in Dunn Township, Otter Tail County, Minnesota. He served in the United States Army and was an instructor for the United States Army Students Training Corps. Dunn was a farmer, resort owner, store clerk, accountant, and bookkeeper. Dunn lived in Pelican Rapids, Minnesota with his wife and family. He served in the Minnesota House of Representatives from 1925 to 1930 and from 1933 to 1966. He was a Republican. Dunn died at Wilder West Nursing Homme in Saint Paul, Minnesota. His funeral was held in Pelican Rapids, Minnesota.
