= Napoleon L'Herault =

American politician (1882–1932)

Napoleon Alexander L'Herault (May 29, 1882 – March 18, 1932) was an American politician and lawyer.

L'Herault was born in Fall River, Massachusetts and moved with his parents in 1882 to Minneapolis, Minnesota. He went to the Minneapolis parochial and public schools. L'Herault worked as a clerk in the United States Post Office, in Minneapolis from 1903 to 1910. In 1907, L'Herault received his law degree from the University of Minnesota Law School and was admitted to the Minnesota Bar. L'Herault served in the Minnesota Senate from 1911 to 1914 and was a Democrat. He died from cancer in Hennepin County, Minnesota at age 49.
