= Frank DeGroat =

American farmer and legislator

- Born: Frank H. DeGroat; May 7, 1916; Morton, Minnesota, U.S.
- Died: August 12, 1989 (aged 73); Fargo, North Dakota, U.S.

Frank H. DeGroat (May 7, 1916 – August 12, 1989) was an American farmer and legislator.

Born in Morton, Minnesota, DeGroat was a dairy and grain farmer in Lake Park, Minnesota. He served in the Minnesota House of Representatives from 1963 to 1976 as a Republican. In 1976, he lost the race for the United States House of Representatives. He died in Fargo, North Dakota of cancer in 1989.
