= James A. Carley =

American politician (1869–1952)

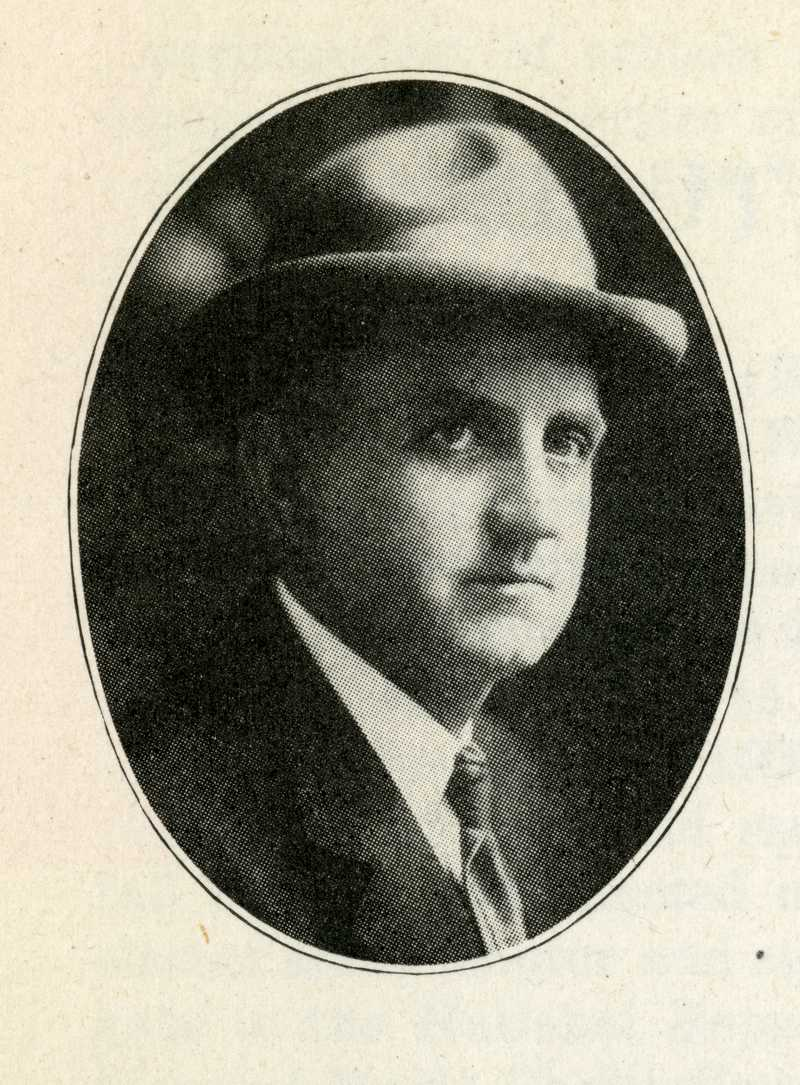
Carley in 1915

James A. Carley (June 17, 1869 – May 14, 1952) was an American lawyer, educator, and politician.

Carley was born on a farm near Oronoco, Olmsted County, Minnesota. He went to Wasioja Seminary in Mantorville, Minnesota. Carley also went to Hamline University, Winona State University and received his law degree from University of Minnesota Law School. He also taught school. Carley lived in Plainview, Wabasha County, Minnesota with his wife and family and practiced law in Plainview. He served on the Plainville Village Council, as the Plainview Village Recorder, and as Mayor of Plainview, Minnesota. He was a Democrat. Carley served in the Minnesota House of Representatives in 1909 and 1910. He then served in the Minnesota Senate from 1915 to 1930 and from 1935 until his death in 1952. He died at his home in Plainview, Minnesota.
