= Roger L. Hanson =

American businessman and politician

Roger L. Hanson (November 11, 1925 – January 3, 2005) was an American businessman and politician.

Born in Pelican Rapids, Minnesota, Hanson went to Dakota Business College and was in the retail hardware and heating and plumbing business in Vergas, Minnesota. He served in the Minnesota House of Representatives from 1969 to 1972 as a Republican and then in the Minnesota Senate from 1973 to 1976.
