= State senator =

Member of an upper house of a U.S. state legislature

A state senator is a member of a state's senate in the bicameral legislature of 49 U.S. states, or a member of the unicameral Nebraska Legislature.

== History ==
There are typically fewer state senators than there are members of a state's lower house; a senator's job is to represent the people at a higher level than a state representative in the lower house. In the past, this meant that senators represented various geographic regions within a state, regardless of the population, as a way of balancing the power of the lower house, which was apportioned according to population. This system changed in 1964, when the Supreme Court of the United States ruled in Reynolds v. Sims that state legislatures must apportion seats in both houses according to population. However, the single-member district system remained, and as a result, the state senates became redundant bodies, as other solutions, such as abolition (as in Canada) or switching to statewide proportional representation (as in Australia) have not been adopted. In some states, such as Texas, the number of state senate seats may be fewer than the number of congressional districts apportioned to that state. While applying the Reynolds ruling to roughly-equal populations, state senate districts are often still drawn along county or multi-county borders.

== Composition ==
Most state senators are elected to four-year terms every presidential election year, with several state senates being elected in staggered even-numbered years. In 26 states, state senates are formally chaired by the Lieutenant governor as president of the senate, while state senators themselves elect a senate president from among themselves in others.

== Powers ==
Similar to the U.S. Senate, state senates are often authorized to confirm gubernatorial nominees to executive or judicial positions.

In four states (Indiana, Oregon, Tennessee, and Texas), both houses define a quorum as two-thirds of members, allowing for several events of quorum-busting. 14 state legislatures permit a state senate filibuster of legislation: Alabama, Alaska, Arkansas, Connecticut, Florida, Hawaii, Idaho, Maine, Missouri, Nebraska, South Carolina, Texas, Utah, and Vermont.

== Unicameral proposals ==
Several proposals for abolition of state senates have been published over the 20th and 21st centuries.
