= Minnesota State Highway 62 (Murray–Cottonwood counties) =

State highway in Minnesota, United States

Trunk Highway 62
- MN 62 highlighted in red

Route information
- Maintained by MnDOT
- Length: 23.992 mi (38.611 km)
- Existed: 1933–present

Major junctions
- West end: US 59 at Fulda
- East end: US 71 / MN 60 at Windom

Location
- Country: United States
- State: Minnesota
- Counties: Murray, Cottonwood

Highway system
- Minnesota Trunk Highway System; Interstate; US; State; Legislative; Scenic
← MN 61	→ MN 62

Minnesota State Highway 62 (MN 62) is a highway in southwest Minnesota, which runs from its intersection with U.S. Highway 59 and Murray County Road 2 in Fulda and continues east to its eastern terminus at its intersection with U.S. 71 and State Highway 60 in Windom.

== Route description ==
Highway 62 is 24 miles (39 km) in length, and serves as an east–west route in southwest Minnesota between the cities of Fulda and Windom. Highway 62 crosses the Des Moines River in Southbrook Township, Springfield Township, and in the city of Windom. The route is also known as 11th Street in Belfast Township.

The route is legally defined as part of Constitutional Route 16 in the Minnesota Statutes. It is not marked with this number.

== History ==
Highway 62 was authorized in 1933. The route was paved by 1942.

A second State Highway 62 exists within the state of Minnesota. In 1988, former Hennepin County Highway 62 in the Twin Cities area was renumbered State Highway 62. MnDOT assigned the Twin Cities route its former Hennepin County numbering because of its local familiarity; and further determined that it was not necessary to renumber existing Highway 62 (between Fulda and Windom) because of what MnDOT perceived as low potential for confusion of the two routes.

== Major intersections ==
County	Location	mi	km	Destinations	Notes
Murray	Fulda	0.000	0.000	US 59 / CR 2 west – Slayton, Worthington	Western terminus of MN 62; eastern terminus of CR 2
Murray	Bondin Township	0.489	0.787	CR 40 – Lime Creek	
Murray	Belfast Township	3.640	5.858	CR 91	
Murray	Belfast Township	5.635	9.069	CR 44	
Murray	Belfast Township	6.626	10.664	CR 46 – Dundas	
Cottonwood	Southbrook Township	8.196	13.190	CR 7	
Cottonwood	Southbrook Township	10.693	17.209	CR 6	
Cottonwood	Springfield Township	13.708	22.061	CR 5	
Cottonwood	Springfield Township	16.418	26.422	CR 40	
Cottonwood	Great Bend Township	19.225	30.940	CR 18 – Wilder	
Cottonwood	Windom	24.012	38.644	US 71 / MN 60 / CR 17 east	Eastern terminus; roadway continues as CR 17.
1.000 mi = 1.609 km; 1.000 km = 0.621 mi
