= Delft, Minnesota =

Unincorporated community in Minnesota, United States

Delft
- Unincorporated community
- Location within the state of Minnesota
- Coordinates: 43°59′11″N 95°05′20″W
- Country: United States
- State: Minnesota
- County: Cottonwood
- Platted: 1902

Government
  - Type: unincorporated (part of Carson Township)
- Elevation: 1,457 ft (444 m)
- Time zone: UTC-6 (Central (CST))
  - Summer (DST): UTC-5 (CDT)
- Area code: 507
- GNIS feature ID: 642752

Delft is an unincorporated community (Class Code U6) located in Carson Township, Cottonwood County, Minnesota, United States.

== Geography ==
Delft is located in the northwestern quarter of the southwestern quarter of section 18, township 106, range 35, west. Its geographic coordinates are 43.9863461 latitude and -95.0888797 longitude. The elevation is 1,457 feet. Delft appears on the Bingham Lake U.S. Geological Survey Map.

== History ==
The village of Delft was established as a railroad station in 1892. Ten years later, on June 18, 1902, the village was officially platted by the Inter-State Land Company. The community was named after the city of Delft, in the Netherlands, previous to which it was called Wilhelmine.

Delft was a station on the Chicago, St. Paul, Minneapolis & Omaha Railroad, which ran through the southwestern part of the township, en route from Jeffers to Bingham Lake. Shortly after the original elevator was built, the village had its first fire, which burned the Farmers Elevator Company, its coal sheds, and the railroad company's stockyards - all of which were rebuilt immediately after. At one time, there was also a general store, hardware store, a general farm implement sales business, as well as a creamery.

Established in a predominantly Mennonite area, by the 1950s approximately 400 members of Mennonite Brethren and General Conference Mennonite churches resided within a five-mile radius of the little community's two Mennonite churches: The Carson Mennonite Brethren Church, founded in 1875 and closed in 2005, and the now independent (as of ca. 2002) Immanuel Mennonite Church, originally established in 1940.

A post office began operation in Delft in 1903. It was closed in 1993.

== Politics ==
Delft is located within Minnesota's 1st congressional district, represented by Jim Hagedorn, a Republican. At the state level, Delft is located in Senate District 22, represented by Republican Bill Weber, and in House District 22B, represented by Republican Rod Hamilton.
