= Highwater Township, Cottonwood County, Minnesota =

Highwater Township, Minnesota
- Township
- Location within the state of Minnesota Highwater Township, Minnesota (the United States)
- Coordinates: 44°8′42″N 95°17′17″W
- Country: United States
- State: Minnesota
- County: Cottonwood

Area
  - Total: 36.2 sq mi (93.7 km^{2})
  - Land: 35.9 sq mi (93.1 km^{2})
  - Water: 0.23 sq mi (0.6 km^{2})
- Elevation: 1,201 ft (366 m)

Population (2010)
  - Total: 166
  - Density: 4.62/sq mi (1.78/km^{2})
- Time zone: UTC-6 (Central (CST))
  - Summer (DST): UTC-5 (CDT)
- FIPS code: 27-29060
- GNIS feature ID: 0664472

Highwater Township is a township in Cottonwood County, Minnesota, United States. The population was 166 at the 2010 census.

Highwater Township was organized in 1874, and named from Highwater Creek.

== Geography ==
According to the United States Census Bureau, the township has a total area of 36.2 square miles (94 km^{2}), of which 35.9 square miles (93 km^{2}) is land and 0.2 square miles (0.52 km^{2}), or 0.64%, is water.

== Demographics ==
As of the census of 2000, there were 169 people, 66 households, and 53 families residing in the township. The population density was 4.7 inhabitants per square mile (1.8/km^{2}). There were 74 housing units at an average density of 2.1 per square mile (0.81/km^{2}). The racial makeup of the township was 100.00% White.

There were 66 households, out of which 30.3% had children under the age of 18 living with them, 75.8% were married couples living together, 1.5% had a female householder with no husband present, and 18.2% were non-families. 15.2% of all households were made up of individuals, and 6.1% had someone living alone who was 65 years of age or older. The average household size was 2.56 and the average family size was 2.87.

In the township the population was spread out, with 24.9% under the age of 18, 7.1% from 18 to 24, 18.3% from 25 to 44, 35.5% from 45 to 64, and 14.2% who were 65 years of age or older. The median age was 44 years. For every 100 females, there were 125.3 males. For every 100 females age 18 and over, there were 111.7 males.

The median income for a household in the township was $45,625, and the median income for a family was $45,938. Males had a median income of $21,705 versus $26,111 for females. The per capita income for the township was $16,858. About 8.2% of families and 10.7% of the population were below the poverty line, including 33.3% of those under the age of eighteen and none of those 65 or over.

== Politics ==
Highwater Township is located in Minnesota's 1st congressional district, represented by Jim Hagedorn, a Republican. At the state level, Highwater Township is located in Senate District 22, represented by Republican Doug Magnus, and in House District 22B, represented by Republican Rod Hamilton.
