= Anthony Carl Knudsen =

American businessman and politician (1874–1931)

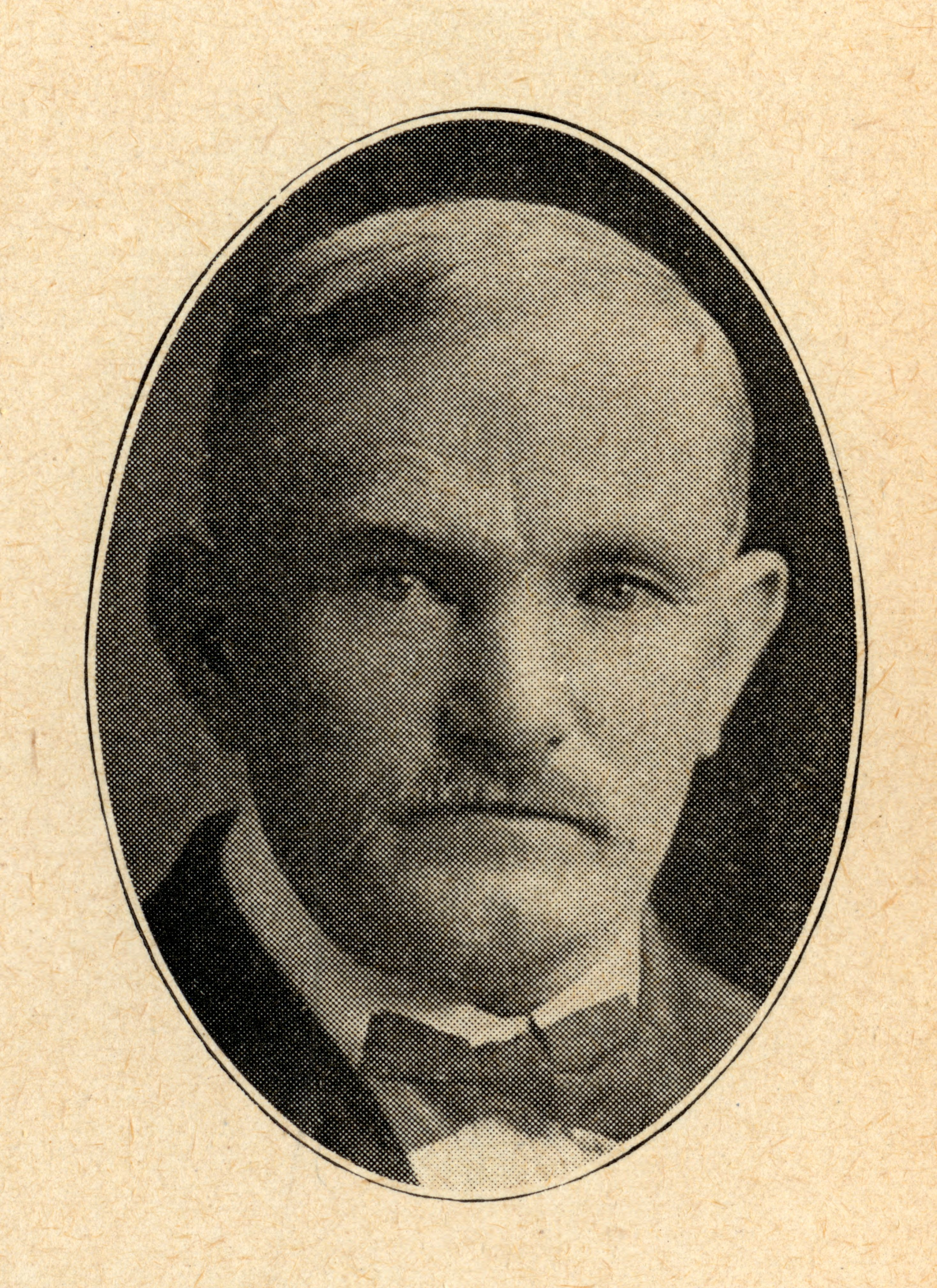
- Knudsen's official portrait in 1923

Member of the Minnesota House of Representatives from the 10th district
- In office January 1, 1923 – May 20, 1931

Personal details
- Born: December 13, 1874 Denmark
- Died: May 20, 1931 (aged 56) Storden, Minnesota, U.S.
- Party: Republican

Anthony Carl Knudsen (December 13, 1874 – May 20, 1931) was an American businessman and politician. Born in Denmark, Knudsen moved to the United States at age 16 and settled in the state of Minnesota, where he engaged in the insurance business. He served in the Minnesota House of Representatives as a representative of the 10th district from 1923 until his death in 1931.

== Early life ==
Anthony Carl Knudsen was born on December 13, 1874, in Denmark. He migrated to New York City when he was 16, with little money and no connections. He was able to get to Milwaukee, Wisconsin, where he was called upon by the conductor and engineer of a freight train, of which most of its crew was "beastly drunk," to serve as the fireman for a train leaving Milwaukee for Austin, Minnesota.

I can truthfully say that when I struck Minnesota I was nothing more nor less than a tramp.

— Knudsen, 1929

From there, Knudsen worked a series of odd jobs across the state. He had served as an apprentice to a blacksmith in Albert Lea, later relocating to Clarks Grove. He moved to Cottonwood County in 1898 and remained there for the rest of his life.

== Career ==
=== Insurance career ===
Around 1902, Knudsen became the secretary of the Westbrook Mutual Fire Insurance Company, a role he would remain in until his death.

=== Legislative career ===
Knudsen was elected to the Minnesota House of Representatives for the 10th district, which covered all of Cottonwood County, on November 7, 1922. He defeated John F. Gustafson, a farmer, with 2,147 total votes, or 54.84% of the total share. Though elections at the time were officially nonpartisan, Knudsen was known to be a Republican. In The Legislative Manual of the State of Minnesota of 1923, listed positions of Knudsen included improvements to agricultural marketing systems, revisions to the state school aid system, adjustments to the state driver's license system, opposition to a minimum wage, and stricter enforcement of prohibition. In his first legislative term, Knudsen served on the House standing commitees of agriculture and horticulture, banks and banking, dairy products and livestock, drainage, insurance, and reapportionment.

Knudsen won re-election to a second term on November 4, 1924, when he defeated future Minnesota State Treasurer C. A. Halverson in the general election with 2,769 votes, or 62.32% of the total share. He retained all of his standing committee appointments from his last term.

On November 2, 1926, Knudsen again defeated Halverson to secure re-election, albeit by a slimmer margin. Knudsen won with 2,207 votes, or 51.15% of the share. Prior to the start of his third term, he indicated his support for keeping funds raised from a fuel tax to the counties in which they were raised. He also supported giving highway workers the power to enforce crime, citing his five years' experience as a highway patrolman. He also recognized the demand for legislation on bank guarantees, though he stated he "cannot support anything unsafe." During his term, he remained in the same standing committees as his previous two terms.

Knudsen defeated Lester H. Smith on November 6, 1928, to secure his fourth term in office. Knudsen won with 2,634 votes, or 52.92% of the share. Knudsen retained all of his standing committee appointments, adding a seat in the committee on reforestation as well.

Knudsen once again defeated Smith on November 4, 1930, to win his fifth term in office. Knudsen improved slightly from his performance last election, securing 2,676 votes, or 56.14% of the share. Knudsen once again kept his standing committee appointments, with the exception of the committee on reforestation. Instead, he was appointed to the commission on public domain. During his term, Knudsen voted in favor of a statewide referendum on prohibition, a measure which was defeated in the House.

== Death ==
Knudsen died on May 20, 1931, shortly after a meeting of the board of directors for the insurance company he worked for. The Star Tribune reported that Knudsen suffered a series of three strokes, succumbing to the final one at his home in Storden. Citing economic reasons, Cottonwood County officials asked Governor Floyd B. Olson to refrain from holding a special election. This left Knudsen's seat vacant until the next legislative session.
