= Storden =

Storden can refer to a community in the United States:

- The city of Storden, Minnesota
- Storden Township, Minnesota
