= Thomas Bondhus =

American politician

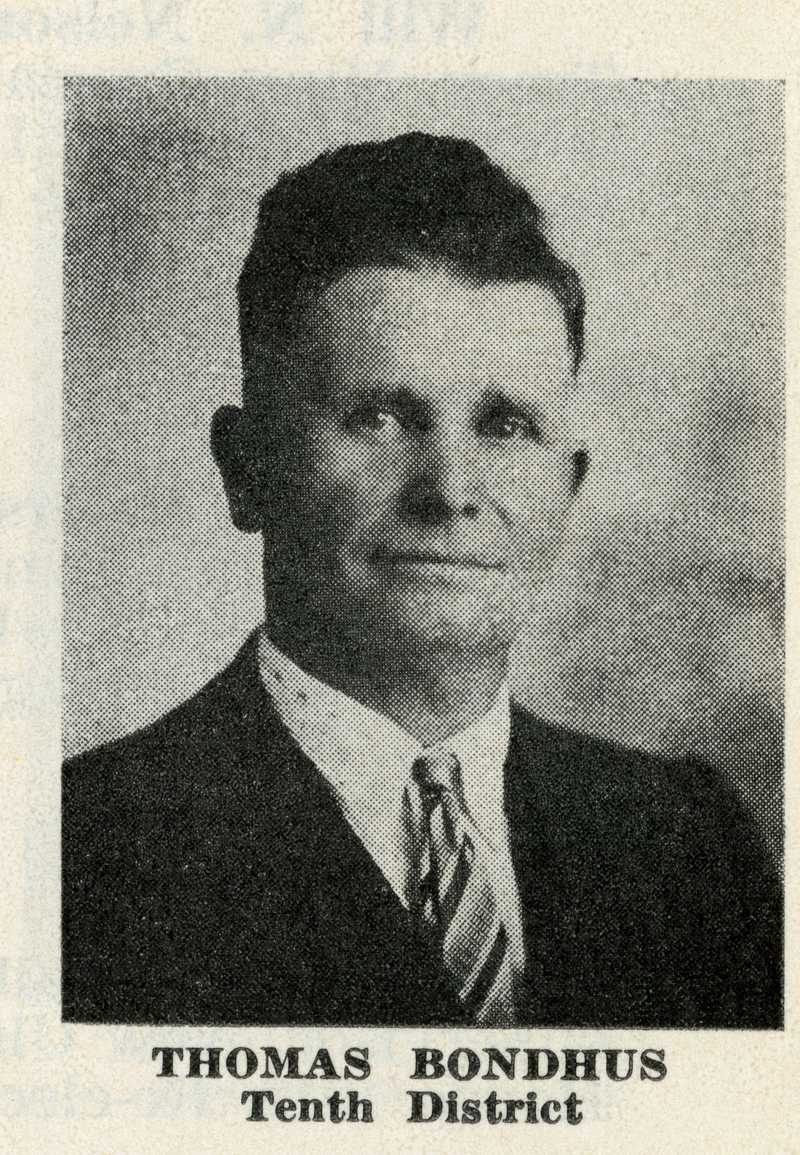

Member of the Minnesota House of Representatives from the 10th district
- In office 1937–1952
- Preceded by: C. A. Halverson
- Succeeded by: Sam M. Franz

Personal details
- Born: February 3, 1880 Clinton County, Iowa
- Died: January 5, 1954 (aged 73) Cottonwood County, Minnesota
- Party: Nonpartisan
- Spouse: Carrie T. Thompson
- Profession: Farmer, legislator, postmaster

Thomas Bondhus (February 3, 1880 – January 5, 1954) was a state representative for Minnesota's 10th district serving Cottonwood County.

== Personal life ==
Bondhus was born on February 3, 1880, in Clinton County, Iowa He moved to Ida County with his parents when he was 3 years old and moved to Minnesota's Cottonwood County in 1895. He married Carrie T. Thompson in 1908 and had 7 children—4 boys and 3 girls. He resided in Storden, Minnesota, throughout his career as a legislator. In addition to government work, Bondhus worked as a farmer and served as secretary of Westbrook Mutual Insurance Co., Storden Co-Operative Company, and Local Township Mutual Insurance Company. He died on January 5, 1954.

== Education ==
Bondhus attended a public school prior to attending college. He attended college at the Minneapolis Business College and also had schooling at Minneapolis Normal School.

== State Legislature ==
Bondhus served in the Minnesota House of Representatives from 1937 to 1952. He was preceded by C. A. Halverson and succeeded by Sam Franz. He was elected in nonpartisan elections, but he caucused in the conservative caucus.

== Other government service ==
In addition to his service in the legislature, Bondhus served as both Township Treasurer and Township Assessor for Amo Township. He also served as assistant postmaster in Westbrook, Minnesota.
