= Lakeside Township, Cottonwood County, Minnesota =

Lakeside Township, Minnesota
- Township
- Location within the state of Minnesota Lakeside Township, Minnesota (the United States)
- Coordinates: 43°53′51″N 95°2′56″W
- Country: United States
- State: Minnesota
- County: Cottonwood

Area
  - Total: 35.3 sq mi (91.4 km^{2})
  - Land: 33.5 sq mi (86.8 km^{2})
  - Water: 1.8 sq mi (4.6 km^{2})
- Elevation: 1,430 ft (436 m)

Population (2010)
  - Total: 237
  - Density: 7.07/sq mi (2.73/km^{2})
- Time zone: UTC-6 (Central (CST))
  - Summer (DST): UTC-5 (CDT)
- FIPS code: 27-35000
- GNIS feature ID: 0664702

Lakeside Township is a township in Cottonwood County, Minnesota, United States. The population was 237 at the 2010 census.

Lakeside Township was organized in 1870, and so named on account of the numerous lakes within its borders.

== Geography ==
According to the United States Census Bureau, the township has a total area of 35.3 square miles (91 km^{2}), of which 33.5 square miles (87 km^{2}) is land and 1.8 square miles (4.7 km^{2}), or 5.02%, is water.

== Demographics ==
As of the census of 2000, there were 255 people, 97 households, and 80 families residing in the township. The population density was 7.6 inhabitants per square mile (2.9/km^{2}). There were 102 housing units at an average density of 3.0 per square mile (1.2/km^{2}). The racial makeup of the township was 97.25% White, 0.78% Asian, and 1.96% from two or more races.

There were 97 households, out of which 29.9% had children under the age of 18 living with them, 79.4% were married couples living together, 2.1% had a female householder with no husband present, and 17.5% were non-families. 14.4% of all households were made up of individuals, and 6.2% had someone living alone who was 65 years of age or older. The average household size was 2.63 and the average family size was 2.94.

In the township the population was spread out, with 24.7% under the age of 18, 5.5% from 18 to 24, 27.1% from 25 to 44, 28.6% from 45 to 64, and 14.1% who were 65 years of age or older. The median age was 42 years. For every 100 females, there were 114.3 males. For every 100 females age 18 and over, there were 113.3 males.

The median income for a household in the township was $39,688, and the median income for a family was $47,500. Males had a median income of $35,000 versus $21,667 for females. The per capita income for the township was $20,758. About 16.3% of families and 19.2% of the population were below the poverty line, including 28.1% of those under the age of eighteen and 16.7% of those 65 or over.

== Politics ==
Lakeside Township is located in Minnesota's 1st congressional district, represented by Jim Hagedorn, a Republican. At the state level, Lakeside Township is located in Senate District 22, represented by Republican Doug Magnus, and in House District 22B, represented by Republican Rod Hamilton.
