= Ann Township, Cottonwood County, Minnesota =

Ann Township, Minnesota
- Township
- Location within the state of Minnesota Ann Township, Minnesota (the United States)
- Coordinates: 44°8′51″N 95°23′33″W
- Country: United States
- State: Minnesota
- County: Cottonwood

Area
  - Total: 36.2 sq mi (93.7 km^{2})
  - Land: 36.2 sq mi (93.7 km^{2})
  - Water: 0 sq mi (0.0 km^{2})
- Elevation: 1,309 ft (399 m)

Population (2010)
  - Total: 179
  - Density: 4.95/sq mi (1.91/km^{2})
- Time zone: UTC-6 (Central (CST))
  - Summer (DST): UTC-5 (CDT)
- FIPS code: 27-01666
- GNIS feature ID: 0663437

Ann Township is a township in Cottonwood County, Minnesota, United States. The population was 179 at the 2010 census.

Ann Township was organized in 1876, and named for the wife of a county commissioner.

== Geography ==
According to the United States Census Bureau, the township has a total area of 36.2 square miles (94 km^{2}), all land.

== Demographics ==
As of the census of 2000, there were 191 people, 75 households, and 63 families residing in the township. The population density was 5.3 inhabitants per square mile (2.0/km^{2}). There were 84 housing units at an average density of 2.3 per square mile (0.89/km^{2}). The racial makeup of the township was 99.48% White, and 0.52% from two or more races. Hispanic or Latino of any race were 0.52% of the population.

There were 75 households, out of which 28.0% had children under the age of 18 living with them, 81.3% were married couples living together, 2.7% had a female householder with no husband present, and 16.0% were non-families. 14.7% of all households were made up of individuals, and 5.3% had someone living alone who was 65 years of age or older. The average household size was 2.55 and the average family size was 2.79.

In the township the population was spread out, with 20.4% under the age of 18, 7.9% from 18 to 24, 18.3% from 25 to 44, 29.3% from 45 to 64, and 24.1% who were 65 years of age or older. The median age was 46 years. For every 100 females, there were 109.9 males. For every 100 females age 18 and over, there were 117.1 males.

The median income for a household in the township was $40,000, and the median income for a family was $41,071. Males had a median income of $27,500 versus $20,625 for females. The per capita income for the township was $20,134. About 2.9% of families and 4.2% of the population were below the poverty line, including none of those under the age of eighteen or sixty five or over.

== Politics ==
Ann Township is located in Minnesota's 1st congressional district, represented by Jim Hagedorn, a Republican. At the state level, Ann Township is located in Senate District 22, represented by Republican Doug Magnus, and in House District 22B, represented by Republican Rod Hamilton.
