= Westbrook Township, Cottonwood County, Minnesota =

Westbrook Township, Minnesota
- Township
- Location within the state of Minnesota Westbrook Township, Minnesota (the United States)
- Coordinates: 44°3′29″N 95°23′28″W
- Country: United States
- State: Minnesota
- County: Cottonwood

Area
  - Total: 35.4 sq mi (91.8 km^{2})
  - Land: 34.7 sq mi (89.9 km^{2})
  - Water: 0.73 sq mi (1.9 km^{2})
- Elevation: 1,375 ft (419 m)

Population (2010)
  - Total: 216
  - Density: 6.22/sq mi (2.40/km^{2})
- Time zone: UTC-6 (Central (CST))
  - Summer (DST): UTC-5 (CDT)
- ZIP code: 56183
- Area code: 507
- FIPS code: 27-69268
- GNIS feature ID: 0665957

Westbrook Township is a township in Cottonwood County, Minnesota, United States. The population was 216 at the 2010 census.

Westbrook Township was organized September 17, 1870 and named for the western branch of Highwater Creek. The village of the same name, was platted June 8, 1900.

== Geography ==
According to the United States Census Bureau, the township has a total area of 35.4 square miles (92 km^{2}), of which 34.7 square miles (90 km^{2}) is land and 0.7 square miles (1.8 km^{2}), or 2.03%, is water.

== Demographics ==
As of the census of 2000, there were 302 people, 102 households, and 85 families residing in the township. The population density was 8.7 people per square mile (3.4/km^{2}). There were 106 housing units at an average density of 3.1/sq mi (1.2/km^{2}). The racial makeup of the township was 99.34% White, 0.66% from other races. Hispanic or Latino of any race were 0.66% of the population.

There were 102 households, out of which 30.4% had children under the age of 18 living with them, 72.5% were married couples living together, 3.9% had a female householder with no husband present, and 15.7% were non-families. 13.7% of all households were made up of individuals, and 7.8% had someone living alone who was 65 years of age or older. The average household size was 2.53 and the average family size was 2.77.

In the township the population was spread out, with 21.2% under the age of 18, 4.6% from 18 to 24, 16.2% from 25 to 44, 28.5% from 45 to 64, and 29.5% who were 65 years of age or older. The median age was 50 years. For every 100 females, there were 94.8 males. For every 100 females age 18 and over, there were 91.9 males.

The median income for a household in the township was $40,000, and the median income for a family was $41,429. Males had a median income of $28,125 versus $21,250 for females. The per capita income for the township was $19,905. About 2.4% of families and 3.2% of the population were below the poverty line, including none of those under the age of eighteen and 8.3% of those 65 or over.

== Politics ==
Westbrook Township is located in Minnesota's 1st congressional district, represented by Tim Walz, a Democrat. At the state level, Westbrook Township is located in Senate District 22, represented by Republican Doug Magnus, and in House District 22B, represented by Republican Rod Hamilton.
