= Dale Township, Cottonwood County, Minnesota =

Dale Township, Minnesota
- Township
- Location within the state of Minnesota Dale Township, Minnesota (the United States)
- Coordinates: 43°59′27″N 95°10′13″W
- Country: United States
- State: Minnesota
- County: Cottonwood

Area
  - Total: 36.1 sq mi (93.4 km^{2})
  - Land: 35.6 sq mi (92.2 km^{2})
  - Water: 0.46 sq mi (1.2 km^{2})
- Elevation: 1,463 ft (446 m)

Population (2010)
  - Total: 151
  - Density: 4.24/sq mi (1.64/km^{2})
- Time zone: UTC-6 (Central (CST))
  - Summer (DST): UTC-5 (CDT)
- FIPS code: 27-14608
- GNIS feature ID: 0663917

Dale Township is a township in Cottonwood County, Minnesota, United States. The population was 151 at the 2010 census.

Dale Township was organized in 1872, and named for the many dales contained within its borders.

== Geography ==
According to the United States Census Bureau, the township has a total area of 36.0 square miles (93 km^{2}), of which 35.6 square miles (92 km^{2}) is land and 0.5 square miles (1.3 km^{2}), or 1.28%, is water.

== Demographics ==
As of the census of 2000, there were 154 people, 65 households, and 47 families residing in the township. The population density was 4.3 inhabitants per square mile (1.7/km^{2}). There were 70 housing units at an average density of 2.0 per square mile (0.77/km^{2}). The racial makeup of the township was 98.05% White, 1.95% from other races. Hispanic or Latino of any race were 1.95% of the population.

There were 65 households, out of which 26.2% had children under the age of 18 living with them, 66.2% were married couples living together, 6.2% had a female householder with no husband present, and 26.2% were non-families. 18.5% of all households were made up of individuals, and 10.8% had someone living alone who was 65 years of age or older. The average household size was 2.37 and the average family size was 2.69.

In the township the population was spread out, with 20.1% under the age of 18, 6.5% from 18 to 24, 24.7% from 25 to 44, 28.6% from 45 to 64, and 20.1% who were 65 years of age or older. The median age was 44 years. For every 100 females, there were 102.6 males. For every 100 females age 18 and over, there were 115.8 males.

The median income for a household in the township was $41,250, and the median income for a family was $45,625. Males had a median income of $27,500 versus $15,625 for females. The per capita income for the township was $20,131. About 7.1% of families and 10.2% of the population were below the poverty line, including 13.6% of those under the age of eighteen and none of those 65 or over.

== Politics ==
Dale Township is located in Minnesota's 1st congressional district, represented by Jim Hagedorn, a Republican. At the state level, Dale Township is located in Senate District 22, represented by Republican Doug Magnus, and in House District 22B, represented by Republican Rod Hamilton.
