= Carson Township =

Carson Township may refer to the following townships in the United States:

- Carson Township, Fayette County, Illinois
- Carson Township, Cottonwood County, Minnesota
