= Jeffers, Minnesota =

City in Minnesota, United States

Jeffers
- City
- Location of Jeffers, Minnesota
- Coordinates: 44°03′21″N 95°11′43″W
- Country: United States
- State: Minnesota
- County: Cottonwood
- incorporated: 1899

Government
  - Type: Mayor - Council
  - Mayor: Brad Prins

Area
  - Total: 0.39 sq mi (1.00 km^{2})
  - Land: 0.39 sq mi (1.00 km^{2})
  - Water: 0 sq mi (0.00 km^{2})
- Elevation: 1,480 ft (450 m)

Population (2020)
  - Total: 349
  - Density: 900.1/sq mi (347.54/km^{2})
- Time zone: UTC-6 (Central (CST))
  - Summer (DST): UTC-5 (CDT)
- ZIP code: 56145
- Area code: 507
- FIPS code: 27-31796
- GNIS feature ID: 2395461
- Website: https://www.jeffers.us.com/

Jeffers is a city in Amboy Township, Cottonwood County, Minnesota, United States. As of the 2020 census, Jeffers had a population of 349.

Minnesota State Highway 30 and County Highway 4 are two of the main routes in the community. U.S. Route 71 is nearby.

== History ==
Jeffers was platted by the Inter-State Land Company on September 19, 1899. It was incorporated as a city a few days later, on September 28, 1899. In its first election, the following men were put into office: President, L. P. Dustin; recorder, Lewis E. Streater; along with trustees, A. W. Binger, A. A. Faust, and C. G. Fredricson.

The town was named for land-owner George Jeffers. A post office has been in operation at Jeffers since 1900.

The Jeffers Petroglyphs, a site listed on the National Register of Historic Places, is a series of Native American stone carvings dating from before European settlement. They are located several miles northeast of the town.

In the center of the city runs a north-south street named "Courthouse Ave". It is rumored that due to its proximity in the center of Cottonwood County, Jeffers was expected to become the county seat of Cottonwood County. Therefore, they chose to name the street in anticipation of a courthouse being built. However, Windom, a city 18 miles to the south, was named the county seat and housed the courthouse.

== Geography ==
According to the United States Census Bureau, the city has a total area of 0.38 square miles (0.98 km^{2}), all land. Jeffers is situated in section 20, township 107, range 36 west, Latitude: 44.06 N, Longitude: 95.20 W.

The Jeffers Petroglyphs are located 15 km (9.3 mi) northeast of Jeffers on Red Rock Ridge.

== Demographics ==
Historical population
Census	Pop.	Note	%±
1910	227		—
1920	393		73.1%
1930	434		10.4%
1940	648		49.3%
1950	516		−20.4%
1960	489		−5.2%
1970	436		−10.8%
1980	437		0.2%
1990	443		1.4%
2000	396		−10.6%
2010	369		−6.8%
2020	349		−5.4%
U.S. Decennial Census

=== 2010 census ===
As of the census of 2010, there were 369 people, 167 households, and 97 families residing in the city. The population density was 971.1 inhabitants per square mile (374.9/km^{2}). There were 196 housing units at an average density of 515.8 per square mile (199.2/km^{2}). The racial makeup of the city was 90.0% White, 0.5% Native American, 0.3% Asian, 6.2% from other races, and 3.0% from two or more races. Hispanic or Latino of any race were 7.0% of the population.

There were 167 households, of which 26.3% had children under the age of 18 living with them, 44.3% were married couples living together, 9.0% had a female householder with no husband present, 4.8% had a male householder with no wife present, and 41.9% were non-families. 38.9% of all households were made up of individuals, and 24% had someone living alone who was 65 years of age or older. The average household size was 2.21 and the average family size was 2.94.

The median age in the city was 46.4 years. 24.7% of residents were under the age of 18; 4.5% were between the ages of 18 and 24; 18.1% were from 25 to 44; 28.1% were from 45 to 64; and 24.4% were 65 years of age or older. The gender makeup of the city was 48.5% male and 51.5% female.

=== 2000 census ===
As of the census of 2000, there were 396 people, 184 households, and 114 families residing in the city. The population density was 1,025.0 inhabitants per square mile (395.8/km^{2}). There were 200 housing units at an average density of 517.7 per square mile (199.9/km^{2}). The racial makeup of the city was 98.74% White, 0.25% Asian, and 1.01% from two or more races. Hispanic or Latino of any race were 0.25% of the population.

There were 184 households, out of which 20.1% had children under the age of 18 living with them, 51.6% were married couples living together, 8.7% had a female householder with no husband present, and 38.0% were non-families. 33.7% of all households were made up of individuals, and 20.7% had someone living alone who was 65 years of age or older. The average household size was 2.15 and the average family size was 2.71.

In the city, the population was spread out, with 19.9% under the age of 18, 5.6% from 18 to 24, 24.5% from 25 to 44, 22.7% from 45 to 64, and 27.3% who were 65 years of age or older. The median age was 45 years. For every 100 females, there were 96.0 males. For every 100 females age 18 and over, there were 89.8 males.

The median income for a household in the city was $29,286, and the median income for a family was $35,625. Males had a median income of $23,125 versus $20,000 for females. The per capita income for the city was $16,649. About 7.3% of families and 9.9% of the population were below the poverty line, including 11.4% of those under age 18 and 10.7% of those age 65 or over.

== Educational institutions ==
Jeffers is part of the consolidated Red Rock Central School District. The district comprises the southwestern Minnesota towns of Sanborn, Lamberton, Storden, and Jeffers with all grades located in Lamberton. The school mascot is the Falcons. From 1971 until pairing with Sanborn and Lamberton in 1993, Jeffers was combined with Storden as the Storden-Jeffers School District. The school's mascot was the Chiefs. Jeffers housed the Red Rock Central Elementary School until 2016, when it was moved to Lamberton.

== Religious institutions ==
- Jeffers United Methodist Church
- Trinity Lutheran Church (ELCA)
- Jeffers Baptist Church
- Red Rock United Methodist Church

== Politics ==
Jeffers is located in Minnesota's 7th congressional district, represented by Michelle Fischbach, a Republican. At the state level, Jeffers is located in Senate District 22, represented by Republican Bill Weber (politician), and in House District 22B, represented by Republican Brian Pfarr.

== Photographs ==
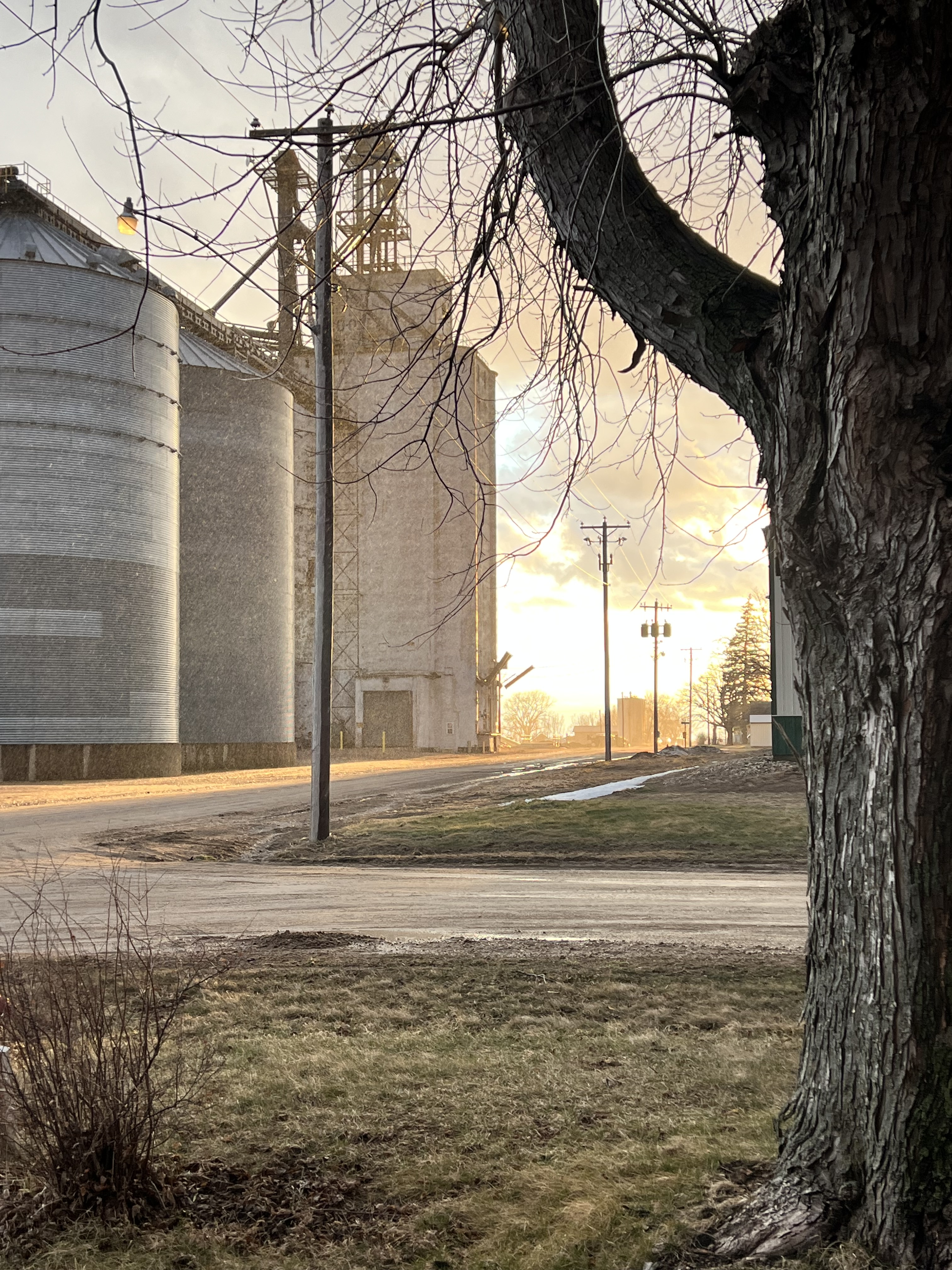
April 2nd, 2024. New Vision Co-Op

This picture was taken as a rainstorm moved into town, during the sunset, creating a warm drizzly haze.
