= Belfast Township =

Belfast Township may refer to the following townships in the United States:

- Belfast Township, Murray County, Minnesota
- Belfast Township, Fulton County, Pennsylvania
