= String Lakes =

Pair of lakes in the state of Minnesota, United States

Coordinates: 43°51.5′N 95°12′W

String Lakes is a pair of lakes in Cottonwood County, in the U.S. state of Minnesota.

The twin lakes were named from the fact their outlines appear like a string.
