= Bingham Lake, Minnesota =

City in Minnesota, United States

Bingham Lake
- City
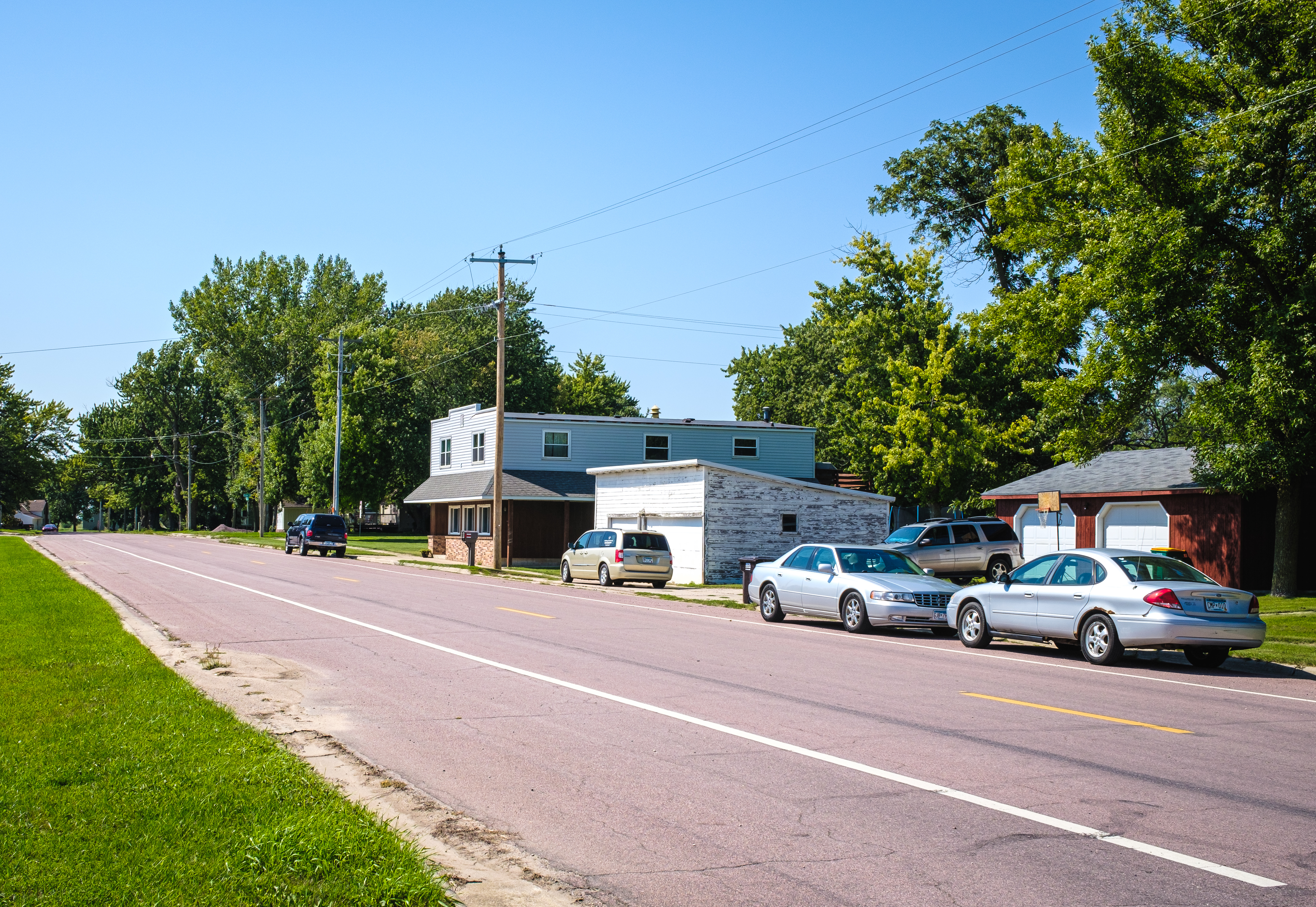

- Location of Bingham Lake, Minnesota
- Coordinates: 43°54′34″N 95°02′45″W
- Country: United States
- State: Minnesota
- County: Cottonwood
- platted: July 28, 1875

Government
  - Type: Mayor - Council
  - Mayor: Bruce ringham(2017)

Area
  - Total: 0.80 sq mi (2.06 km^{2})
  - Land: 0.80 sq mi (2.06 km^{2})
  - Water: 0 sq mi (0.00 km^{2})
- Elevation: 1,421 ft (433 m)

Population (2020)
  - Total: 137
  - Density: 171.9/sq mi (66.36/km^{2})
- Time zone: UTC-6 (Central (CST))
  - Summer (DST): UTC-5 (CDT)
- ZIP code: 56118
- Area code: 507
- FIPS code: 27-05896
- GNIS feature ID: 2394169

Bingham Lake is a city in Cottonwood County, Minnesota, United States. The population was 137 at the 2020 census.

== History ==
Bingham Lake was platted on July 28, 1875, and incorporated in 1900. The city took its name from nearby Bingham Lake. A post office called Bingham Lake was established in 1871, and remained in operation until it was discontinued in 1992.

== Geography ==
According to the United States Census Bureau, the city has a total area of 0.75 square miles (1.94 km^{2}), all land.

Minnesota State Highway 60 serves as a main route in the community.

== Demographics ==
Historical population
Census	Pop.	Note	%±
1880	44		—
1900	311		—
1910	285		−8.4%
1920	273		−4.2%
1930	243		−11.0%
1940	251		3.3%
1950	229		−8.8%
1960	254		10.9%
1970	214		−15.7%
1980	222		3.7%
1990	155		−30.2%
2000	167		7.7%
2010	126		−24.6%
2020	137		8.7%
U.S. Decennial Census

=== 2010 census ===
As of the census of 2010, there were 126 people, 55 households, and 34 families residing in the city. The population density was 168.0 inhabitants per square mile (64.9/km^{2}). There were 63 housing units at an average density of 84.0 per square mile (32.4/km^{2}). The racial makeup of the city was 96.0% White, 0.8% Asian, 2.4% from other races, and 0.8% from two or more races.

There were 55 households, of which 27.3% had children under the age of 18 living with them, 54.5% were married couples living together, 3.6% had a female householder with no husband present, 3.6% had a male householder with no wife present, and 38.2% were non-families. 34.5% of all households were made up of individuals, and 18.1% had someone living alone who was 65 years of age or older. The average household size was 2.29 and the average family size was 2.97.

The median age in the city was 46 years. 24.6% of residents were under the age of 18; 1.6% were between the ages of 18 and 24; 20.8% were from 25 to 44; 34% were from 45 to 64; and 19% were 65 years of age or older. The gender makeup of the city was 53.2% male and 46.8% female.

=== 2000 census ===
As of the census of 2000, there were 167 people, 60 households, and 46 families residing in the city. The population density was 214.7 inhabitants per square mile (82.9/km^{2}). There were 65 housing units at an average density of 83.6 per square mile (32.3/km^{2}). The racial makeup of the city was 92.81% White, 0.60% African American, 0.60% Asian, 1.80% Pacific Islander, 2.40% from other races, and 1.80% from two or more races. Hispanic or Latino of any race were 3.59% of the population.

There were 60 households, out of which 41.7% had children under the age of 18 living with them, 61.7% were married couples living together, 11.7% had a female householder with no husband present, and 23.3% were non-families. 20.0% of all households were made up of individuals, and 6.7% had someone living alone who was 65 years of age or older. The average household size was 2.78 and the average family size was 3.24.

In the city, the population was spread out, with 30.5% under the age of 18, 6.6% from 18 to 24, 27.5% from 25 to 44, 27.5% from 45 to 64, and 7.8% who were 65 years of age or older. The median age was 34 years. For every 100 females, there were 138.6 males. For every 100 females age 18 and over, there were 114.8 males.

The median income for a household in the city was $33,750, and the median income for a family was $37,917. Males had a median income of $22,083 versus $17,083 for females. The per capita income for the city was $11,820. About 4.9% of families and 14.5% of the population were below the poverty line, including 23.2% of those under the age of eighteen and none of those 65 or over.

== Politics ==
Bingham Lake is located in Minnesota's 1st congressional district, represented by Jim Hagedorn, a Republican. At the state level, Bingham Lake is located in Senate District 22, represented by Republican Bill Weber (politician), and in House District 22B, represented by Republican Rod Hamilton.
