= Midway Township, Cottonwood County, Minnesota =

Midway Township is a township in Cottonwood County, Minnesota, United States. The population was 219 at the 2010 census. The city of Mountain Lake is located in the township.

== History ==
Midway Township was organized in 1895. The township was named for its location on the rail line halfway between Sioux City, Iowa and St. Paul, Minnesota.

== Geography ==
According to the United States Census Bureau, the township has a total area of 34.6 square miles (90 km^{2}), of which 34.3 square miles (89 km^{2}) is land and 0.4 square miles (1.0 km^{2}), or 1.04%, is water.

== Demographics ==
As of the census of 2000, there were 297 people, 105 households, and 87 families residing in the township. The population density was 8.7 inhabitants per square mile (3.4/km^{2}). There were 112 housing units at an average density of 3.3 per square mile (1.3/km^{2}). The racial makeup of the township was 94.95% White, 1.68% Asian, 2.36% from other races, and 1.01% from two or more races. Hispanic or Latino of any race were 2.02% of the population. 75.9% were of German and 8.9% Norwegian ancestry according to Census 2000.

There were 105 households, out of which 37.1% had children under the age of 18 living with them, 80.0% were married couples living together, 1.9% had a female householder with no husband present, and 17.1% were non-families. 13.3% of all households were made up of individuals, and 7.6% had someone living alone who was 65 years of age or older. The average household size was 2.83 and the average family size was 3.14.

In the township the population was spread out, with 30.0% under the age of 18, 6.4% from 18 to 24, 24.9% from 25 to 44, 18.5% from 45 to 64, and 20.2% who were 65 years of age or older. The median age was 38 years. For every 100 females, there were 100.7 males. For every 100 females age 18 and over, there were 108.0 males.

The median income for a household in the township was $38,750, and the median income for a family was $39,875. Males had a median income of $27,917 versus $16,500 for females. The per capita income for the township was $19,818. About 1.9% of families and 7.3% of the population were below the poverty line, including 21.1% of those under the age of eighteen and none of those 65 or over.

== Government ==
Midway Township is located in Minnesota's 1st congressional district, represented by Jim Hagedorn, a Republican. At the state level, Midway Township is located in Senate District 22, represented by Republican Doug Magnus, and in House District 22B, represented by Republican Rod Hamilton.
