= Bingham Lake (Minnesota) =

Lake in the state of Minnesota, United States

- Location within Minnesota
- Location: Cottonwood County, Minnesota
- Coordinates: 43°55′15″N 95°2′49″W
- Type: Lake
- Surface elevation: 1,384 feet (422 m)

Bingham Lake is a lake in Cottonwood County, Minnesota, in the United States.

The lake was named for Kinsley S. Bingham, a U.S. Senator, and the 11th Governor of the State of Michigan.

== See also ==
- List of lakes in Minnesota
