= Great Bend Township, Cottonwood County, Minnesota =

Great Bend Township, Minnesota
- Township
- Location within the state of Minnesota Great Bend Township, Minnesota (the United States)
- Coordinates: 43°53′18″N 95°8′37″W
- Country: United States
- State: Minnesota
- County: Cottonwood

Area
  - Total: 32.3 sq mi (83.6 km^{2})
  - Land: 31.6 sq mi (81.8 km^{2})
  - Water: 0.69 sq mi (1.8 km^{2})
- Elevation: 1,365 ft (416 m)

Population (2010)
  - Total: 287
  - Density: 9.09/sq mi (3.51/km^{2})
- Time zone: UTC-6 (Central (CST))
  - Summer (DST): UTC-5 (CDT)
- FIPS code: 27-25514
- GNIS feature ID: 0664334

Great Bend Township is a township in Cottonwood County, Minnesota, United States. The population was 287 at the 2010 census.

Great Bend Township was organized in 1870. It was named for a nearby meander on the Des Moines River.

== Geography ==
According to the United States Census Bureau, the township has a total area of 32.3 square miles (84 km^{2}), of which 31.6 square miles (82 km^{2}) is land and 0.7 square miles (1.8 km^{2}), or 2.17%, is water.

== Demographics ==
As of the census of 2000, there were 326 people, 125 households, and 98 families residing in the township. The population density was 10.3 inhabitants per square mile (4.0/km^{2}). There were 140 housing units at an average density of 4.4 per square mile (1.7/km^{2}). The racial makeup of the township was 97.85% White, 0.92% African American, 0.31% Asian, 0.31% from other races, and 0.61% from two or more races. Hispanic or Latino of any race were 1.23% of the population.

There were 125 households, out of which 30.4% had children under the age of 18 living with them, 70.4% were married couples living together, 3.2% had a female householder with no husband present, and 21.6% were non-families. 20.0% of all households were made up of individuals, and 7.2% had someone living alone who was 65 years of age or older. The average household size was 2.61 and the average family size was 2.99.

In the township the population was spread out, with 26.1% under the age of 18, 5.8% from 18 to 24, 21.8% from 25 to 44, 32.5% from 45 to 64, and 13.8% who were 65 years of age or older. The median age was 43 years. For every 100 females, there were 113.1 males. For every 100 females age 18 and over, there were 107.8 males.

The median income for a household in the township was $36,406, and the median income for a family was $40,833. Males had a median income of $25,500 versus $20,000 for females. The per capita income for the township was $16,134. About 7.3% of families and 12.2% of the population were below the poverty line, including 16.8% of those under age 18 and 2.0% of those age 65 or over.

== Politics ==
Great Bend Township is located in Minnesota's 1st congressional district, represented by Jim Hagedorn, a Republican. At the state level, Great Bend Township is located in Senate District 22, represented by Republican Doug Magnus, and in House District 22B, represented by Republican Rod Hamilton.
