= C. A. Halverson =

American farmer, educator, and politician

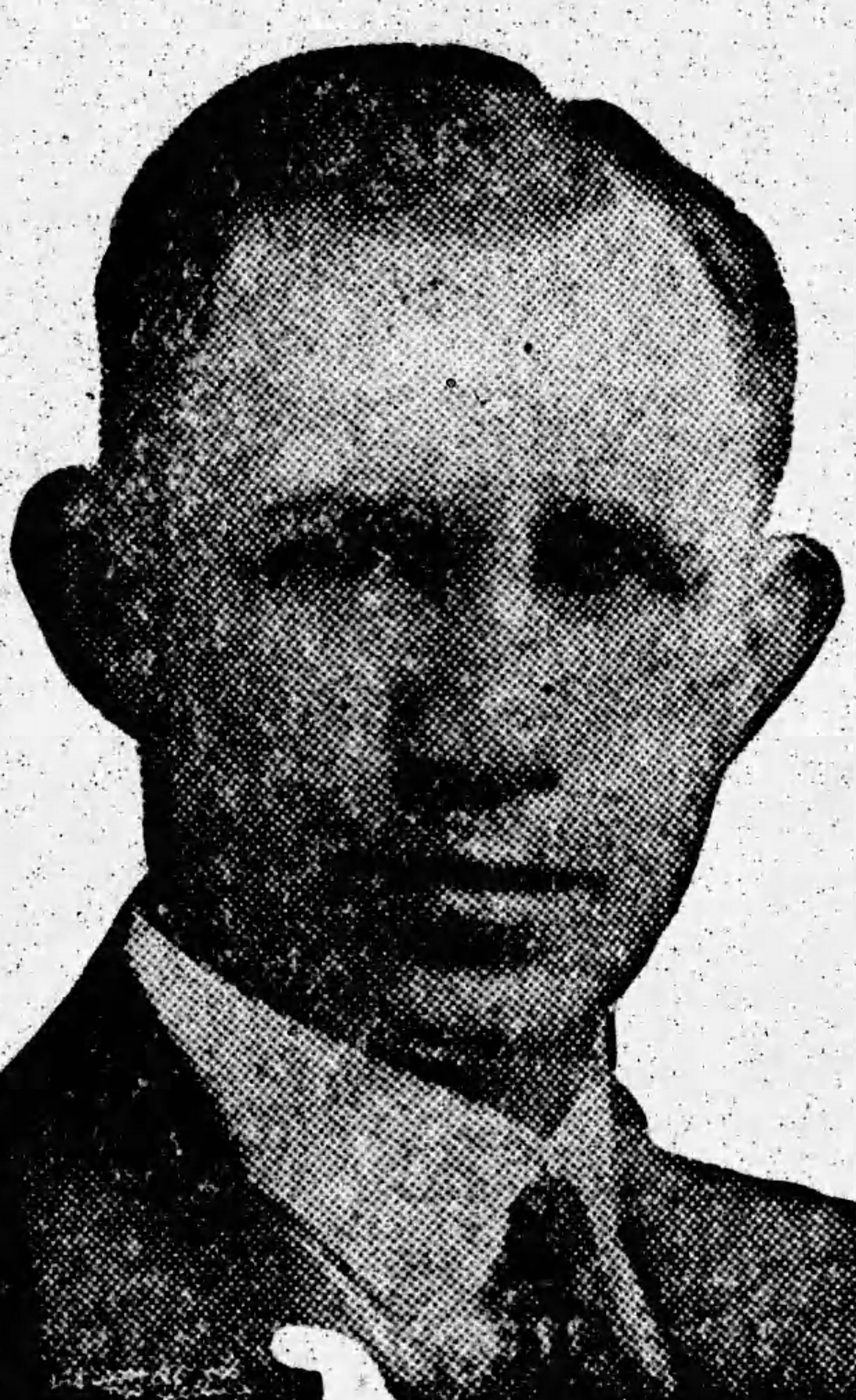
C. A. Halverson

Carl Alfred "C. A." Halverson (October 27, 1886 – June 3, 1947) was an American farmer, educator, and politician.

Born in Cottonwood County, Minnesota, Halverson graduated from Windom High School and then went to the University of Minnesota Agriculture College. He then taught school and was a farmer. He served on the Cotton County Board of Commissioners. He also served on the Lamberton Township Board and on the Lamberton School Board. From 1933 to 1936, Halverson served in the Minnesota House of Representatives, where he was succeeded by Thomas Bondhus. He then served as Minnesota State Treasurer from 1937 to 1939. He died at his home, in Revere, Minnesota, from heart problems.

== Notes ==
Party political offices
Preceded by Albert H. Kleffman	Farmer–Labor nominee for Minnesota State Treasurer; 1936, 1938, 1940	Succeeded by Charles J. Johnson
Political offices
Preceded by Julius A. Schmahl	Treasurer of Minnesota; 1937–1939	Succeeded by Julius A. Schmahl
