= Amo Township, Cottonwood County, Minnesota =

Amo Township, Minnesota
- Township
- Location within the state of Minnesota Amo Township, Minnesota (the United States)
- Coordinates: 43°58′55″N 95°16′33″W
- Country: United States
- State: Minnesota
- County: Cottonwood

Area
  - Total: 35.8 sq mi (92.8 km^{2})
  - Land: 35.1 sq mi (91.0 km^{2})
  - Water: 0.69 sq mi (1.8 km^{2})
- Elevation: 1,447 ft (441 m)

Population (2010)
  - Total: 132
  - Density: 3.76/sq mi (1.45/km^{2})
- Time zone: UTC-6 (Central (CST))
  - Summer (DST): UTC-5 (CDT)
- FIPS code: 27-01441
- GNIS feature ID: 0663430

Amo Township is a township in Cottonwood County, Minnesota, United States. The population was 132 at the 2010 census.

Amo Township was organized in 1873. The name Amo is derived from Latin, meaning "I love".

== Geography ==
According to the United States Census Bureau, the township has a total area of 35.8 square miles (93 km^{2}), of which 35.1 square miles (91 km^{2}) is land and 0.7 square miles (1.8 km^{2}), or 1.98%, is water.

== Demographics ==
As of the census of 2000, there were 140 people, 52 households, and 40 families residing in the township. The population density was 4.0 inhabitants per square mile (1.5/km^{2}). There were 63 housing units at an average density of 1.8 per square mile (0.69/km^{2}). The racial makeup of the township was 100.00% White.

There were 52 households, out of which 36.5% had children under the age of 18 living with them, 73.1% were married couples living together, 3.8% had a female householder with no husband present, and 21.2% were non-families. 17.3% of all households were made up of individuals, and 7.7% had someone living alone who was 65 years of age or older. The average household size was 2.69 and the average family size was 3.07.

In the township the population was spread out, with 28.6% under the age of 18, 5.7% from 18 to 24, 27.1% from 25 to 44, 28.6% from 45 to 64, and 10.0% who were 65 years of age or older. The median age was 40 years. For every 100 females, there were 102.9 males. For every 100 females age 18 and over, there were 117.4 males.

The median income for a household in the township was $55,625, and the median income for a family was $65,625. Males had a median income of $28,750 versus $19,000 for females. The per capita income for the township was $25,945. There were 6.1% of families and 13.5% of the population living below the poverty line, including 26.2% of under eighteens and 37.5% of those over 64.

== Politics ==
Amo Township is located in Minnesota's 1st congressional district, represented by Jim Hagedorn, a Republican. At the state level, Amo Township is located in Senate District 22, represented by Republican Doug Magnus, and in House District 22B, represented by Republican Rod Hamilton.
