= Amboy Township, Cottonwood County, Minnesota =

Amboy Township, Minnesota
- Township
- Location within the state of Minnesota
- Coordinates: 44°3′27″N 95°9′1″W
- Country: United States
- State: Minnesota
- County: Cottonwood

Area
  - Total: 35.6 sq mi (92.3 km^{2})
  - Land: 35.6 sq mi (92.3 km^{2})
  - Water: 0 sq mi (0.0 km^{2})
- Elevation: 1,453 ft (443 m)

Population (2010)
  - Total: 164
  - Density: 4.60/sq mi (1.78/km^{2})
- Time zone: UTC-6 (Central (CST))
  - Summer (DST): UTC-5 (CDT)
- FIPS code: 27-01342
- GNIS feature ID: 0663427

Amboy Township (/ˈæmbɔɪ/ AM-boy) is a township in Cottonwood County, Minnesota, United States. The population was 164 at the 2010 census.

Amboy Township was organized in 1872.

== Geography ==
According to the United States Census Bureau, the township has a total area of 35.6 square miles (92 km^{2}), all land.

== Demographics ==
As of the census of 2000, there were 172 people, 73 households, and 52 families residing in the township. The population density was 4.8 inhabitants per square mile (1.9/km^{2}). There were 79 housing units at an average density of 2.2 per square mile (0.85/km^{2}). The racial makeup of the township was 100.00% White. Hispanic or Latino of any race were 1.74% of the population.

There were 73 households, out of which 23.3% had children under the age of 18 living with them, 67.1% were married couples living together, 1.4% had a female householder with no husband present, and 27.4% were non-families. 26.0% of all households were made up of individuals, and 11.0% had someone living alone who was 65 years of age or older. The average household size was 2.36 and the average family size was 2.81.

In the township the population was spread out, with 20.3% under the age of 18, 7.0% from 18 to 24, 20.3% from 25 to 44, 32.6% from 45 to 64, and 19.8% who were 65 years of age or older. The median age was 46 years. For every 100 females, there were 107.2 males. For every 100 females age 18 and over, there were 114.1 males.

The median income for a household in the township was $35,250, and the median income for a family was $41,250. Males had a median income of $30,909 versus $25,000 for females. The per capita income for the township was $20,877. About 8.3% of families and 7.8% of the population were below the poverty line, including 16.7% of those under the age of eighteen and none of those 65 or over.

== Politics ==
Amboy Township is located in Minnesota's 7th congressional district, represented by Michelle Fischbach, a Republican. At the state level, Jeffers is located in Senate District 22, represented by Republican Bill Weber (politician), and in House District 22B, represented by Republican Brian Pfarr.
