= Rose Hill Township, Cottonwood County, Minnesota =

Rose Hill Township, Minnesota
- Township
- Location within the state of Minnesota Rose Hill Township, Minnesota (the United States)
- Coordinates: 43°59′7″N 95°23′26″W
- Country: United States
- State: Minnesota
- County: Cottonwood

Area
  - Total: 36.5 sq mi (94.6 km^{2})
  - Land: 35.8 sq mi (92.6 km^{2})
  - Water: 0.81 sq mi (2.1 km^{2})
- Elevation: 1,434 ft (437 m)

Population (2010)
  - Total: 166
  - Density: 4.64/sq mi (1.79/km^{2})
- Time zone: UTC-6 (Central (CST))
  - Summer (DST): UTC-5 (CDT)
- FIPS code: 27-55672
- GNIS feature ID: 0665464

Rose Hill Township is a township in Cottonwood County, Minnesota, United States. The population was 166 at the 2010 census.

Rose Hill Township was organized in 1879, and named for the abundant wild rose bushes and small hills contained within its borders.

== Geography ==
According to the United States Census Bureau, the township has a total area of 36.5 square miles (95 km^{2}), of which 35.7 square miles (92 km^{2}) is land and 0.8 square miles (2.1 km^{2}), or 2.19%, is water.

== Demographics ==
As of the census of 2000, there were 189 people, 69 households, and 54 families residing in the township. The population density was 5.3 people per square mile (2.0/km^{2}). There were 76 housing units at an average density of 2.1/sq mi (0.8/km^{2}). The racial makeup of the township was 100.00% White.

There were 69 households, out of which 37.7% had children under the age of 18 living with them, 76.8% were married couples living together, and 21.7% were non-families. 18.8% of all households were made up of individuals, and 8.7% had someone living alone who was 65 years of age or older. The average household size was 2.74 and the average family size was 3.15.

In the township the population was spread out, with 31.7% under the age of 18, 3.2% from 18 to 24, 23.3% from 25 to 44, 27.5% from 45 to 64, and 14.3% who were 65 years of age or older. The median age was 38 years. For every 100 females, there were 117.2 males. For every 100 females age 18 and over, there were 98.5 males.

The median income for a household in the township was $39,688, and the median income for a family was $41,250. Males had a median income of $26,964 versus $20,000 for females. The per capita income for the township was $14,594. About 7.4% of families and 7.0% of the population were below the poverty line, including 5.6% of those under the age of eighteen and none of those 65 or over.

== Politics ==
Rose Hill Township is located in Minnesota's 1st congressional district, represented by Tim Walz, a Democrat. At the state level, Rose Hill Township is located in Senate District 22, represented by Republican Doug Magnus, and in House District 22B, represented by Republican Rod Hamilton.
