= Carson Township, Cottonwood County, Minnesota =

Carson Township, Minnesota
- Township
- Location within the state of Minnesota Carson Township, Minnesota (the United States)
- Coordinates: 43°58′49″N 95°3′10″W
- Country: United States
- State: Minnesota
- County: Cottonwood

Area
  - Total: 35.9 sq mi (93.0 km^{2})
  - Land: 35.3 sq mi (91.4 km^{2})
  - Water: 0.62 sq mi (1.6 km^{2})
- Elevation: 1,394 ft (425 m)

Population (2020)
  - Total: 283
  - Density: 8.02/sq mi (3.10/km^{2})
- Time zone: UTC-6 (Central (CST))
  - Summer (DST): UTC-5 (CDT)
- FIPS code: 27-10108
- GNIS feature ID: 0663757

Carson Township is a township in Cottonwood County, Minnesota, United States. The population was 283 at the 2020 census.

== History ==
Carson Township was organized in 1871, and named for Kit Carson, an American frontiersman.

== Geography ==
According to the United States Census Bureau, the township has a total area of 35.9 square miles (93 km^{2}), of which 35.3 square miles (91 km^{2}) is land and 0.6 square miles (1.6 km^{2}), or 1.7%, is water.

== Demographics ==
As of the census of 2000, there were 311 people, 116 households, and 93 families residing in the township. The population density was 8.8 inhabitants per square mile (3.4/km^{2}). There were 125 housing units at an average density of 3.5 per square mile (1.4/km^{2}). The racial makeup of the township was 97.43% White, 2.25% Asian, and 0.32% from two or more races. Hispanic or Latino of any race were 0.32% of the population.

There were 116 households, out of which 31.9% had children under the age of 18 living with them, 74.1% were married couples living together, 2.6% had a female householder with no husband present, and 19.8% were non-families. 17.2% of all households were made up of individuals, and 6.0% had someone living alone who was 65 years of age or older. The average household size was 2.68 and the average family size was 3.04.

In the township the population was spread out, with 25.4% under the age of 18, 8.0% from 18 to 24, 23.8% from 25 to 44, 27.0% from 45 to 64, and 15.8% who were 65 years of age or older. The median age was 41 years. For every 100 females, there were 116.0 males. For every 100 females age 18 and over, there were 116.8 males.

The median income for a household in the township was $38,250, and the median income for a family was $41,042. Males had a median income of $31,250 versus $17,750 for females. The per capita income for the township was $14,597. About 5.7% of families and 6.2% of the population were below the poverty line, including 7.5% of those under age 18 and 7.0% of those age 65 or over.

== Politics ==
Carson Township is located in Minnesota's 1st congressional district, represented by Jim Hagedorn, a Republican. At the state level, Carson Township is located in Senate District 22, represented by Republican Doug Magnus, and in House District 22B, represented by Republican Rod Hamilton.
