= Lime Creek, Minnesota =

- Unincorporated community
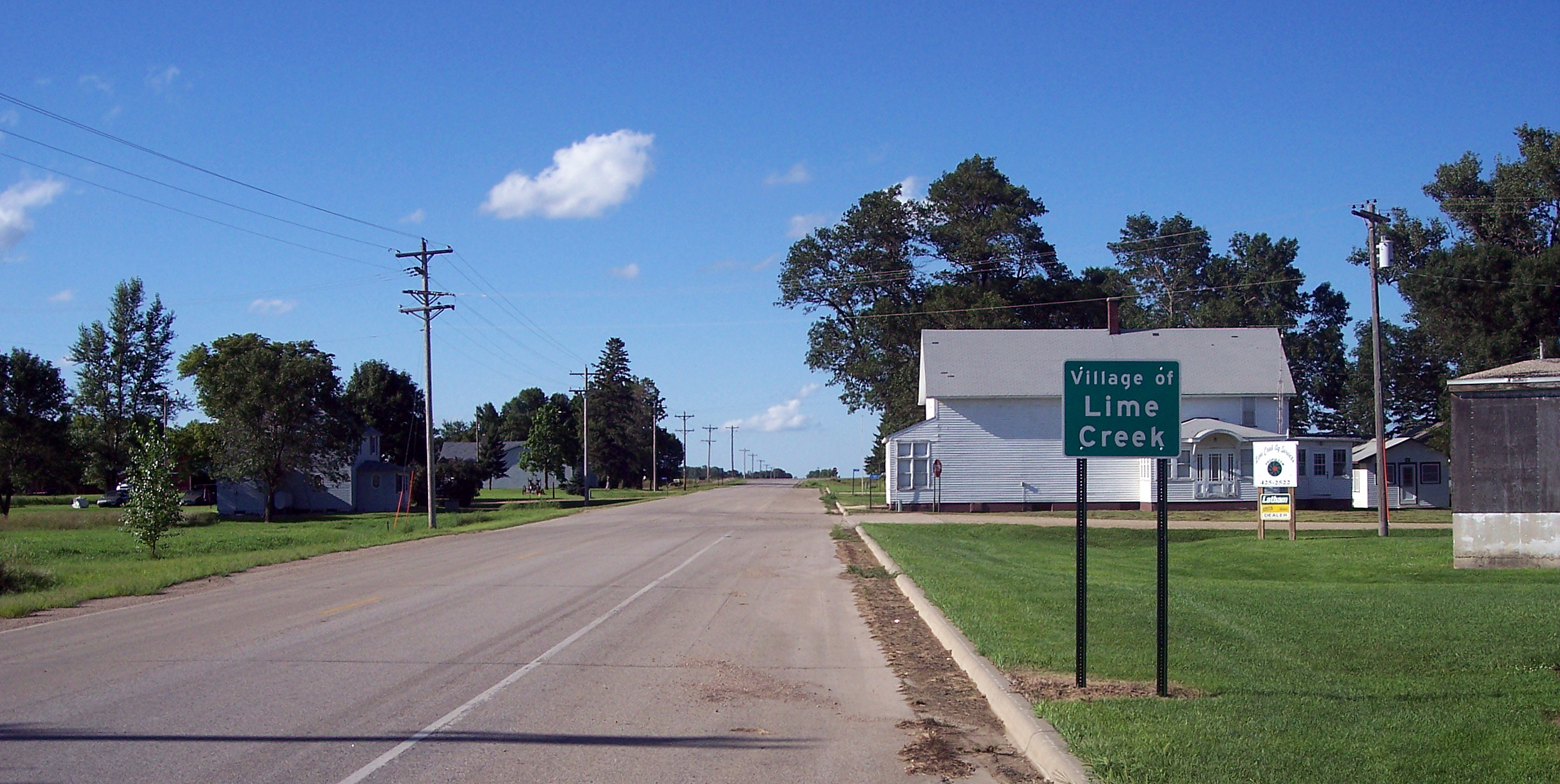
- View of Lime Creek (facing north). There are structures in the community that are not visible in this photo.

- Location within Minnesota Location within the United States
- Coordinates: 43°53′23″N 95°33′43″W
- Country: United States
- State: Minnesota
- County: Murray
- Township: Belfast
- Elevation: 1,489 ft (454 m)
- Time zone: UTC-6 (Central (CST))
  - Summer (DST): UTC-5 (CDT)
- ZIP code: 56131
- Area code: 507
- GNIS feature ID: 654796

Lime Creek is an unincorporated community in Belfast Township, Murray County, Minnesota, United States. It is located two miles northeast of Fulda.

== History ==
A post office was established at Lime Creek in 1889, and remained in operation until it was discontinued in 1971. The community took its name from nearby Lime Creek.
