= Southbrook Township, Cottonwood County, Minnesota =

Southbrook Township, Minnesota
- Township
- Location within the state of Minnesota Southbrook Township, Minnesota (the United States)
- Coordinates: 43°53′2″N 95°23′29″W
- Country: United States
- State: Minnesota
- County: Cottonwood

Area
  - Total: 36.4 sq mi (94.2 km^{2})
  - Land: 34.2 sq mi (88.7 km^{2})
  - Water: 2.1 sq mi (5.4 km^{2})
- Elevation: 1,427 ft (435 m)

Population (2010)
  - Total: 79
  - Density: 2.3/sq mi (0.89/km^{2})
- Time zone: UTC-6 (Central (CST))
  - Summer (DST): UTC-5 (CDT)
- FIPS code: 27-61294
- GNIS feature ID: 0665646

Southbrook Township is a township in Cottonwood County, Minnesota, United States. The population was 79 at the 2010 census.

Southbrook Township was organized in 1871, and named for the numerous small springs which flow to the Des Moines River.

== Geography ==
According to the United States Census Bureau, the township has a total area of 36.3 square miles (94 km^{2}), of which 34.3 square miles (89 km^{2}) is land and 2.1 square miles (5.4 km^{2}), or 5.78%, is water.

== Demographics ==
As of the census of 2000, there were 112 people, 40 households, and 33 families residing in the township. The population density was 3.3 people per square mile (1.3/km^{2}). There were 43 housing units at an average density of 1.3/sq mi (0.5/km^{2}). The racial makeup of the township was 100.00% White.

There were 40 households, out of which 35.0% had children under the age of 18 living with them, 72.5% were married couples living together, 5.0% had a female householder with no husband present, and 17.5% were non-families. 12.5% of all households were made up of individuals, and 5.0% had someone living alone who was 65 years of age or older. The average household size was 2.80 and the average family size was 3.12.

In the township the population was spread out, with 27.7% under the age of 18, 6.3% from 18 to 24, 22.3% from 25 to 44, 33.0% from 45 to 64, and 10.7% who were 65 years of age or older. The median age was 41 years. For every 100 females, there were 107.4 males. For every 100 females age 18 and over, there were 118.9 males.

The median income for a household in the township was $41,250, and the median income for a family was $45,625. Males had a median income of $36,250 versus $16,250 for females. The per capita income for the township was $14,154. There were 10.0% of families and 6.0% of the population living below the poverty line, including no under eighteens and none of those over 64.

== Politics ==
Southbrook Township is located in Minnesota's 1st congressional district, represented by Tim Walz, a Democrat. At the state level, Southbrook Township is located in Senate District 22, represented by Republican Doug Magnus, and in House District 22B, represented by Republican Rod Hamilton.
