= Jeffers Petroglyphs =

- Jeffers Petroglyphs Site
- U.S. National Register of Historic Places
- Minnesota State Register of Historic Places
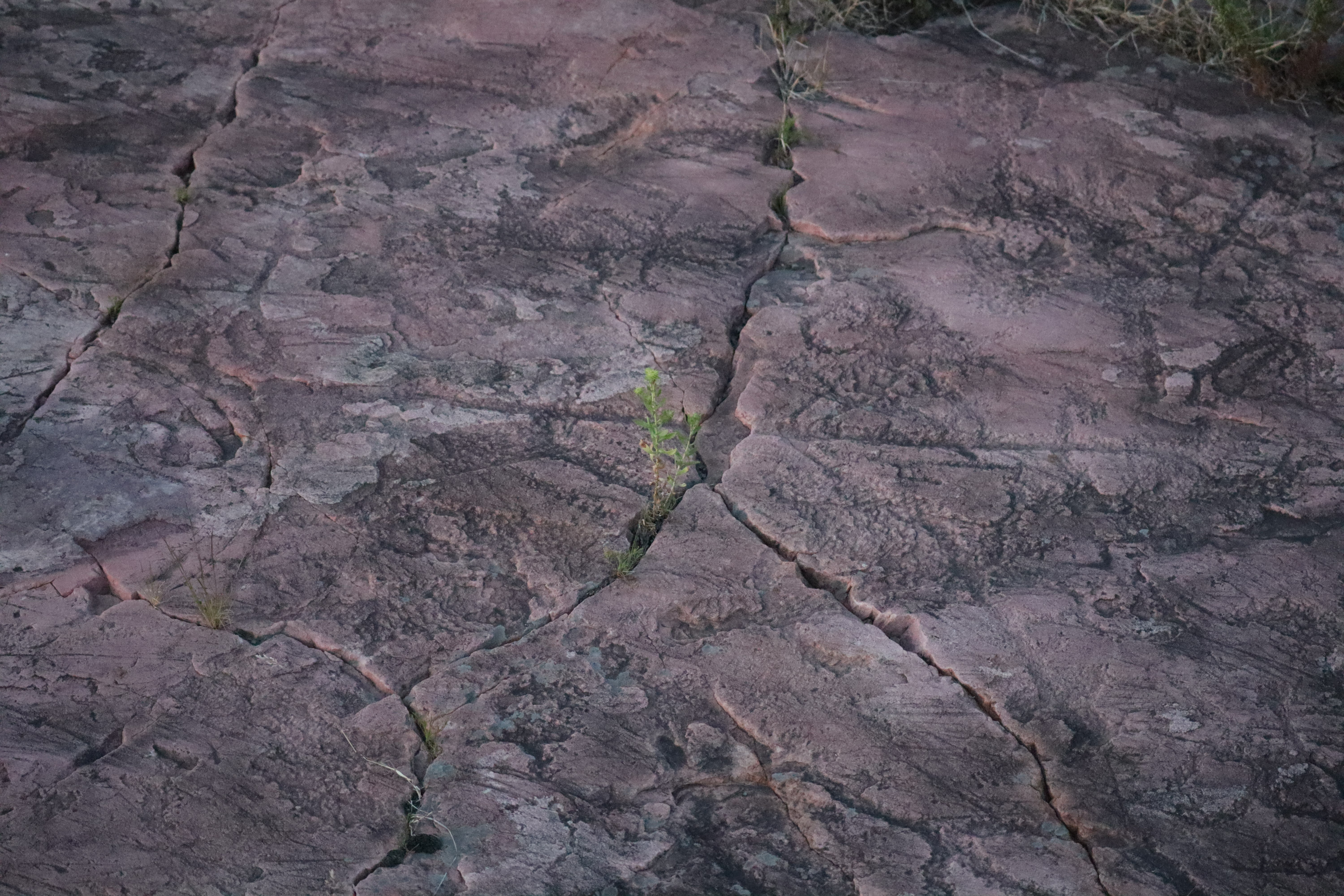
- Jeffers Petroglyphs in 2024

- Location within Minnesota Location within the United States
- Nearest city: Jeffers, Minnesota
- Coordinates: 44°5′31″N 95°3′13″W
- NRHP reference No.: 70000291
- Added to NRHP: October 15, 1970

The Jeffers Petroglyphs site is an outcrop in southwestern Minnesota with pre-contact Native American petroglyphs. The petroglyphs are pecked into rock of the Red Rock Ridge, a 23-mile (37 km)-long Sioux quartzite outcrop that extends from Watonwan County, Minnesota to Brown County, Minnesota. The exposed surface is approximately 150 by 650 feet (50 by 200 m) and surrounded by virgin prairie.

== History ==
"The site lies in an area inhabited in the early historic period by the Dakota Indians, and both the style and form of some of the carvings are identical with motifs that appear on Dakota hide paintings and their quill designs and beadwork. Others are foreign to this Plains Indian tradition and seem to be much earlier in origin." Several old wagon trail ruts traverse the site, one of which is believed to be the old stage coach route from New Ulm, Minnesota to Sioux Falls, South Dakota.

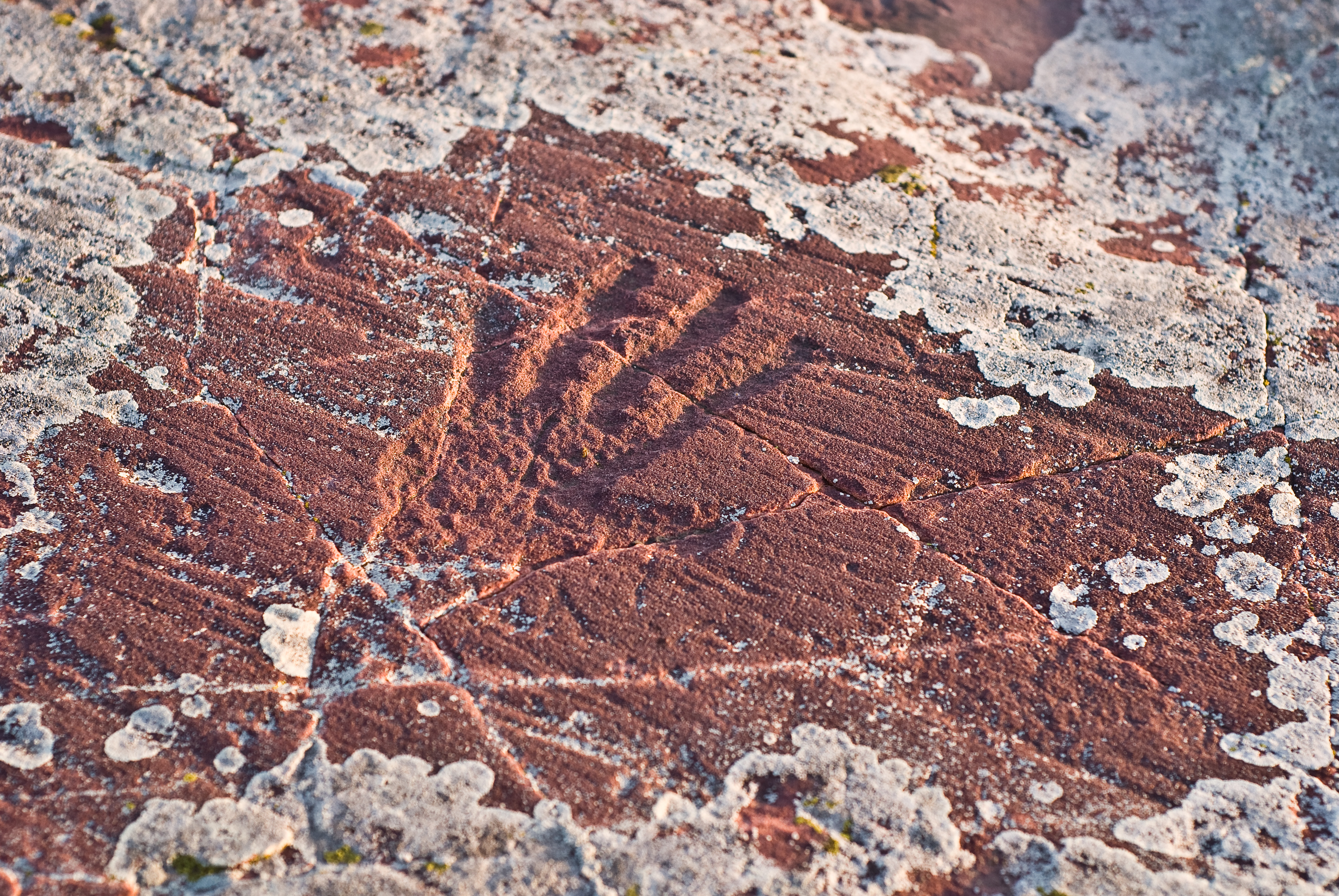
Lichen around a carved hand, a common design in the petroglyphs

The exact age of the petroglyphs is not known, but the earliest petroglyphs are estimated to be from 9000 to 7000 years ago (7000 to 5000 BCE). but some atlatl symbols at Jeffers are a close match with similar symbols at Indian Knoll in Kentucky, which have been dated to 3000 BCE during the Late Archaic Period. Another clue to the age comes from the projectile point carvings, which show a projectile point design used by hunters in the Late Archaic Period. Other carvings, such as thunderbirds, dragonflies, turtles, and shamans, indicate symbols used by later tribes such as the Otoe tribe, Sioux, and Iowa tribe. These are believed to date between 900 CE and 1750 CE. There are over 4000 American Indian images preserved in the bedrock. The bedrock was flattened and smoothed over by glaciers 14000 years ago.

Several archaeologists have hypothesized theories about the purpose of the carvings. Some hypotheses include the practice of hunting magic, performance of sacred ceremonies, or recording historical events in the lives of warriors, shamans, and chiefs. The exact age and purpose of the carvings is only speculation, not established fact. Meanwhile, some Native Americans view the Jeffers site as sacred ground and a very spiritual place, not merely a site to be studied and speculated upon. Jerry Flute, a Dakota elder, was quoted as saying, "To the contemporary Native Americans who reside in and around the state, [Jeffers Petroglyphs] is a very spiritual place. It is a place where Grandmother Earth speaks of the past, present and future."

The Minnesota Historical Society purchased the site from W. R. Jeffers, Jr. in 1966 and it was added to the National Register of Historic Places in 1970. It is maintained by the Minnesota Historical Society and is open to the public between May and September. The site is bracketed by two important tracts of tallgrass prairie: Rock Ridge Prairie Scientific and Natural Area to the northwest and Red Rock Prairie, a preserve of The Nature Conservancy, to the east. Here federally threatened prairie bush clover is found, as well as big bluestem, Indian grass, gray-headed coneflower, Maximilian's sunflower, cordgrass and coreopsis. The upland sandpiper, regal fritillary and Poweshiek skipper can be found on these prairies.

The visitor center is open from May through September and features hands-on exhibits and a multimedia presentation about the site. Daily natural and cultural history programs are offered about such topics as archaeology, how Native Americans made and used the atlatl, a travois and cordage, and prairie wildlife and plants.

== Astronomy at Jeffers Petroglyphs ==
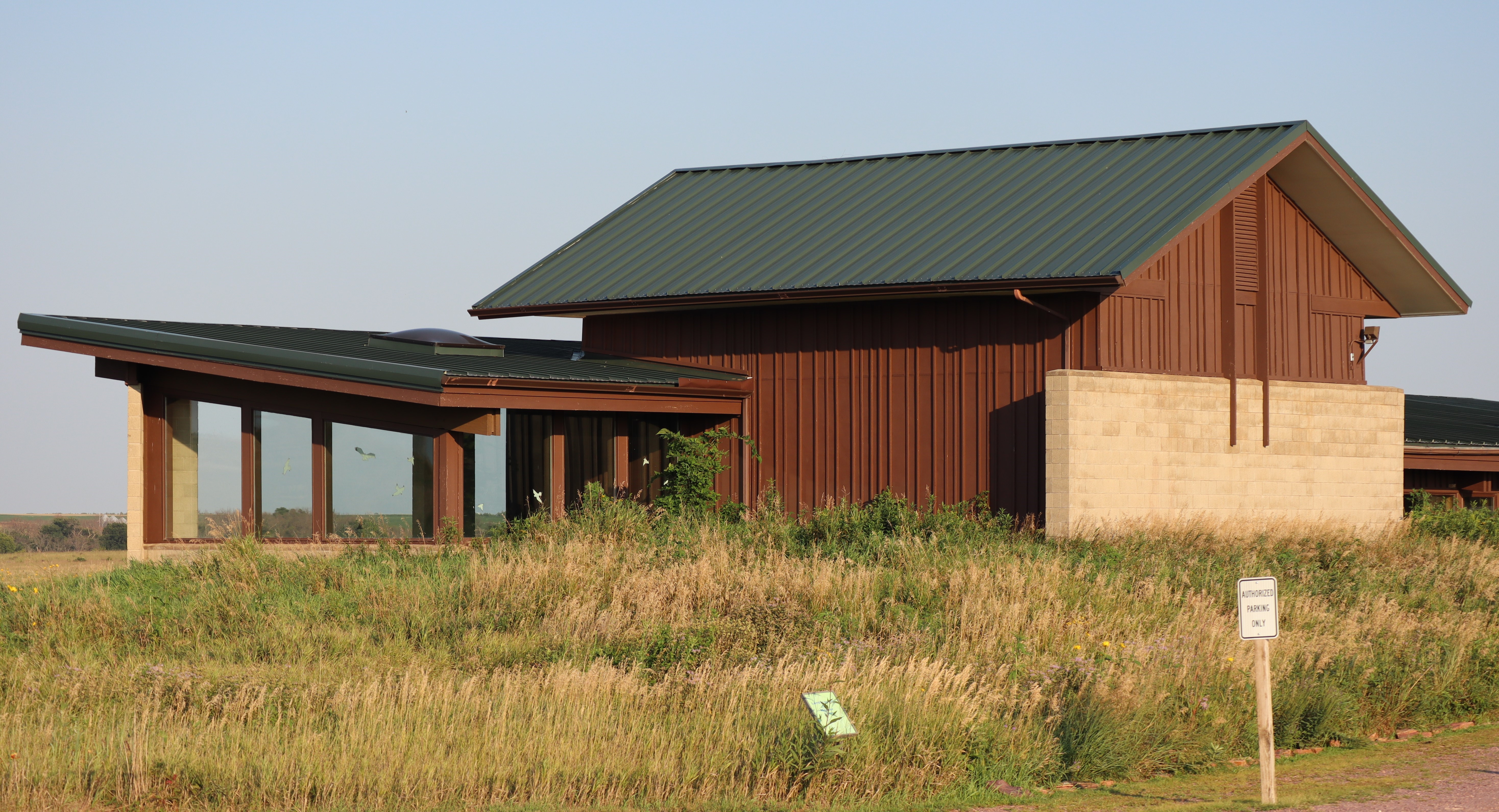
Jeffers Petroglyphs Visitor Center

The Starry Night, Prairie Night event is held annually in the park, hosted by the Bell Museum of Natural History and Minnesota Historical Society. During this time the park manager allows amateur astronomers to use the park and facilities. Many amateur astronomers attend this event and several members bring their telescopes and allow, and often encourage, others to share their views of the night sky. This site is valued not only because of its historic nature but also because of its dark night skies. The site is much darker than most populated areas in Minnesota and is rated green by the Clear Sky Chart.
