= Storden, Minnesota =

City in Minnesota, United States

Storden
- City
- Location of Storden, Minnesota
- Coordinates: 44°02′23″N 95°19′09″W
- Country: United States
- State: Minnesota
- County: Cottonwood
- platted: July 8, 1903

Government
  - Type: Mayor - Council
  - Mayor: Michael W. Timm

Area
  - Total: 0.22 sq mi (0.57 km^{2})
  - Land: 0.22 sq mi (0.57 km^{2})
  - Water: 0 sq mi (0.00 km^{2})
- Elevation: 1,398 ft (426 m)

Population (2020)
  - Total: 225
  - Density: 1,016.3/sq mi (392.39/km^{2})
- Time zone: UTC-6 (Central (CST))
  - Summer (DST): UTC-5 (CDT)
- ZIP code: 56174
- Area code: 507
- FIPS code: 27-63022
- GNIS feature ID: 2395975
- Website: www.rrcnet.org/~storden/

Storden is a city in Cottonwood County, Minnesota, United States. As of the 2020 census, Storden had a population of 225.

== History ==
The town of Storden was platted July 8, 1903 and named in honor of the area's first settler, Nels Storden, an immigrant from Norway. According to the Storden Centennial book written in 2003, the name “Storden” was adopted on March 30, 1875, named for the island of Stord near Bergen in Norway. Stord is a large island in the west coast province of Sunnhordland and is located at the mouth of the Hardangerfjord.

Storden Baptist Church was established on July 12, 1879. Amo Lutheran Church was founded in 1887.

== Geography ==
According to the United States Census Bureau, the city has a total area of 0.22 square miles (0.57 km^{2}), all land.

Minnesota State Highway 30 and County Highway 5 are two of the main routes in the community.

== Demographics ==
Historical population
Census	Pop.	Note	%±
1930	285		—
1940	331		16.1%
1950	398		20.2%
1960	390		−2.0%
1970	364		−6.7%
1980	341		−6.3%
1990	283		−17.0%
2000	274		−3.2%
2010	219		−20.1%
2020	225		2.7%
U.S. Decennial Census

=== 2010 census ===
As of the census of 2010, there were 219 people, 104 households, and 57 families residing in the city. The population density was 995.5 inhabitants per square mile (384.4/km^{2}). There were 124 housing units at an average density of 563.6 per square mile (217.6/km^{2}). The racial makeup of the city was 96.8% White, 1.4% African American, and 1.8% from two or more races. Hispanic or Latino of any race were 0.9% of the population.

There were 104 households, of which 24.0% had children under the age of 18 living with them, 49.0% were married couples living together, 4.8% had a female householder with no husband present, 1.0% had a male householder with no wife present, and 45.2% were non-families. 39.4% of all households were made up of individuals, and 13.5% had someone living alone who was 65 years of age or older. The average household size was 2.11 and the average family size was 2.89.

The median age in the city was 44.8 years. 22.8% of residents were under the age of 18; 6% were between the ages of 18 and 24; 21.9% were from 25 to 44; 29.2% were from 45 to 64; and 20.1% were 65 years of age or older. The gender makeup of the city was 52.1% male and 47.9% female.

=== 2000 census ===
As of the census of 2000, there were 274 people, 120 households, and 81 families residing in the city. The population density was 1,279.5 inhabitants per square mile (494.0/km^{2}). There were 132 housing units at an average density of 616.4 per square mile (238.0/km^{2}). The racial makeup of the city was 95.99% White, 3.28% from other races, and 0.73% from two or more races. Hispanic or Latino of any race were 5.11% of the population.

There were 120 households, out of which 20.0% had children under the age of 18 living with them, 60.8% were married couples living together, 3.3% had a female householder with no husband present, and 32.5% were non-families. 30.0% of all households were made up of individuals, and 17.5% had someone living alone who was 65 years of age or older. The average household size was 2.28 and the average family size was 2.77.

In the city, the population was spread out, with 21.5% under the age of 18, 7.7% from 18 to 24, 20.4% from 25 to 44, 25.2% from 45 to 64, and 25.2% who were 65 years of age or older. The median age was 46 years. For every 100 females, there were 95.7 males. For every 100 females age 18 and over, there were 93.7 males.

The median income for a household in the city was $30,694, and the median income for a family was $42,917. Males had a median income of $28,750 versus $22,000 for females. The per capita income for the city was $15,134. About 16.1% of families and 14.7% of the population were below the poverty line, including 16.7% of those under the age of eighteen and 12.1% of those 65 or over.

== Politics ==
Storden is located in Minnesota's 7th congressional district, represented by Michelle Fischbach, a Republican. At the state level, Storden is located in Senate District 22, represented by Republican Doug Magnus, and in House District 22B, represented by Republican Rod Hamilton.

== Educational institutions ==
Storden is part of the consolidated Red Rock Central School District. The district comprises the southwestern Minnesota towns of Sanborn, Lamberton, Jeffers, and Storden with the Elementary School and Red Rock Central High School in Lamberton. The school mascot is the Falcon. From 1971 until consolidation with Sanborn and Lamberton in 1992, Storden was combined with Jeffers as the Storden-Jeffers Senior High School. The school's mascot was the Chiefs. Prior to 1971, the Storden High School "Tigers" played in the Red Rock Conference with other neighboring schools like Westbrook, Jeffers, Sanborn, Lamberton, and Walnut Grove. Other sports only pairings included Windom-Storden-Jeffers for cross-country from the late 80s to 1992. In 1990 Westbrook-Storden Jeffers (Chargers) were paired for football, and again from 91-92 as the Red Rock Chargers that added Walnut Grove to Westbrook Storden Jeffers.

== Notable residents ==
- Thomas Bondhus, Minnesota state representative
- Anthony Carl Knudsen, Minnesota state representative
