= Highwater Creek =

Stream in Redwood and Cottonwood County, Minnesota, U.S.

Coordinates: 44°12′59″N 95°14′22″W

Highwater Creek is a stream in Redwood and Cottonwood counties, in the U.S. state of Minnesota.

Highwater Creek was named for its potential for flash flooding during heavy rain.

== See also ==
- List of rivers of Minnesota
