= Springfield Township, Cottonwood County, Minnesota =

Springfield Township, Minnesota
- Township
- Location within the state of Minnesota Springfield Township, Minnesota (the United States)
- Coordinates: 43°53′49″N 95°16′14″W
- Country: United States
- State: Minnesota
- County: Cottonwood

Area
  - Total: 36.1 sq mi (93.5 km^{2})
  - Land: 36.1 sq mi (93.4 km^{2})
  - Water: 0.039 sq mi (0.1 km^{2})
- Elevation: 1,460 ft (445 m)

Population (2010)
  - Total: 120
  - Density: 3.3/sq mi (1.3/km^{2})
- Time zone: UTC-6 (Central (CST))
  - Summer (DST): UTC-5 (CDT)
- FIPS code: 27-61834
- GNIS feature ID: 0665671

Springfield Township is a township in Cottonwood County, Minnesota, United States. The population was 120 at the 2010 census.

Springfield Township was organized August 27, 1870.

== Geography ==
According to the United States Census Bureau, the township has a total area of 36.1 square miles (93 km^{2}), of which 36.1 square miles (93 km^{2}) is land and 0.04 square miles (0.10 km^{2}), or 0.08%, is water.

== Demographics ==
As of the census of 2000, there were 161 people, 64 households, and 49 families residing in the township. The population density was 4.5 people per square mile (1.7/km^{2}). There were 70 housing units at an average density of 1.9/sq mi (0.7/km^{2}). The racial makeup of the township was 99.38% White, 0.62% from other races. Hispanic or Latino of any race were 2.48% of the population.

There were 64 households, out of which 35.9% had children under the age of 18 living with them, 71.9% were married couples living together, 1.6% had a female householder with no husband present, and 21.9% were non-families. 18.8% of all households were made up of individuals, and 7.8% had someone living alone who was 65 years of age or older. The average household size was 2.52 and the average family size was 2.86.

In the township the population was spread out, with 23.0% under the age of 18, 6.2% from 18 to 24, 26.1% from 25 to 44, 29.8% from 45 to 64, and 14.9% who were 65 years of age or older. The median age was 40 years. For every 100 females, there were 101.3 males. For every 100 females age 18 and over, there were 103.3 males.

The median income for a household in the township was $39,286, and the median income for a family was $39,821. Males had a median income of $30,625 versus $16,250 for females. The per capita income for the township was $15,175. None of the families and 1.3% of the population were living below the poverty line, including no under eighteens and 10.0% of those over 64.

== Politics ==
Springfield Township is located in Minnesota's 1st congressional district, represented by Tim Walz, a Democrat. At the state level, Springfield Township is located in Senate District 22, represented by Republican Doug Magnus, and in House District 22B, represented by Republican Rod Hamilton.
