= Storden Township, Cottonwood County, Minnesota =

Storden Township, Minnesota
- Township
- Location within the state of Minnesota Storden Township, Minnesota (the United States)
- Coordinates: 44°3′47″N 95°17′35″W
- Country: United States
- State: Minnesota
- County: Cottonwood

Area
  - Total: 35.8 sq mi (92.8 km^{2})
  - Land: 35.7 sq mi (92.5 km^{2})
  - Water: 0.12 sq mi (0.3 km^{2})
- Elevation: 1,503 ft (458 m)

Population (2010)
  - Total: 165
  - Density: 4.62/sq mi (1.78/km^{2})
- Time zone: UTC-6 (Central (CST))
  - Summer (DST): UTC-5 (CDT)
- ZIP code: 56174
- Area code: 507
- FIPS code: 27-63040
- GNIS feature ID: 0665723

Storden Township is a township in Cottonwood County, Minnesota, United States. The population was 165 at the 2010 census.

Storden Township was organized March 30, 1875, and named for Nels Storden, an early Norwegian settler, after initially being named "Norsk". The village of the same name was platted July 8, 1903.

== Geography ==
According to the United States Census Bureau, the township has a total area of 35.8 square miles (93 km^{2}), of which 35.7 square miles (92 km^{2}) is land and 0.1 square miles (0.26 km^{2}), or 0.28%, is water.

== Demographics ==
As of the census of 2000, there were 198 people, 87 households, and 58 families residing in the township. The population density was 5.5 people per square mile (2.1/km^{2}). There were 91 housing units at an average density of 2.5/sq mi (1.0/km^{2}). The racial makeup of the township was 100.00% White.

There were 87 households, out of which 24.1% had children under the age of 18 living with them, 60.9% were married couples living together, 4.6% had a female householder with no husband present, and 32.2% were non-families. 27.6% of all households were made up of individuals, and 14.9% had someone living alone who was 65 years of age or older. The average household size was 2.28 and the average family size was 2.73.

In the township the population was spread out, with 22.2% under the age of 18, 6.1% from 18 to 24, 27.3% from 25 to 44, 27.3% from 45 to 64, and 17.2% who were 65 years of age or older. The median age was 41 years. For every 100 females, there were 104.1 males. For every 100 females age 18 and over, there were 102.6 males.

The median income for a household in the township was $38,750, and the median income for a family was $44,063. Males had a median income of $36,875 versus $14,375 for females. The per capita income for the township was $37,695. About 6.8% of families and 4.5% of the population were below the poverty line, including none of those under the age of eighteen or sixty five or over.

== Politics ==
Storden Township is located in Minnesota's 1st congressional district, represented by Tim Walz, a Democrat. At the state level, Storden Township is located in Senate District 22, represented by Republican Doug Magnus, and in House District 22B, represented by Republican Rod Hamilton.
