= Brian Pfarr =

American politician

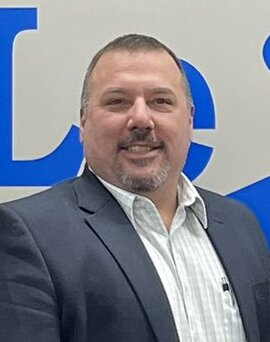
- Pfarr in 2023

Member of the Minnesota House of Representatives from the 22B district
- In office January 5, 2021 – January 14, 2025
- Preceded by: Bob Vogel
- Succeeded by: Terry Stier

Personal details
- Born: November 27, 1968 (age 57)
- Party: Republican
- Spouse: Kristan
- Children: 2
- Education: Minnesota State University, Mankato (BS, MS)
- Occupation: Business executive; Bank President
- Website: Government website Campaign website

Military service
- Branch/service: United States Army
- Years of service: 1987–2021
- Rank: Colonel
- Unit: Minnesota Army National Guard

Brian Pfarr (born November 27, 1968) is an American politician who served in the Minnesota House of Representatives from 2021 to 2025. A member of the Republican Party of Minnesota, Pfarr represented District 22B south of the Twin Cities metropolitan area, including the cities of Belle Plaine and Le Sueur and portions of Blue Earth, Le Sueur, Rice and Scott Counties.

== Early life, education and career ==
Pfarr grew up on a farm near Gaylord, Minnesota. He earned a Bachelor of Science degree in business management and a Master of Science in education from Minnesota State University, Mankato.

From 1987 to 2021, Pfarr served in the Minnesota Army National Guard, retiring with the rank of colonel. He was awarded the Bronze Star Medal for his military service.

From 2000 to 2005, Pfarr was a farm business management instructor at South Central College in North Mankato, Minnesota. Since 2005, he has been president of the Minnesota branch of First Farmers & Merchants Bank.

Pfarr served on the Le Sueur Economic and Development Authority Committee and was a member of the Comprehensive Panning Working Group and the Le Sueur-Henderson School Board.

== Minnesota House of Representatives ==
Pfarr was elected to the Minnesota House of Representatives in 2020 and was reelected in 2022. He first ran after three-term Republican incumbent Bob Vogel announced he would not seek reelection.

Pfarr served on the Commerce Finance and Policy, Legacy Finance, and Ways and Means Committees.

== Electoral history ==
2020 Minnesota State House - District 20A
Party	Candidate	Votes	%
Republican	Brian Pfarr	16,922	68.65
Democratic (DFL)	Erina Prom	7,705	31.26
Write-in		23	0.09
Total votes		24,650	100.0
Republican hold			

2022 Minnesota State House - District 22B
Party	Candidate	Votes	%
Republican	Brian Pfarr (incumbent)	13,225	68.67
Democratic (DFL)	Marcia Stapleton	6,023	31.27
Write-in		11	0.06
Total votes		19,259	100.0
Republican hold			

== Personal life ==
Pfarr lives in Le Sueur, Minnesota with his spouse, Kristan, and has two children. His second cousin is Pam Altendorf, who has served in the Minnesota House of Representatives since 2023.
