= Belfast Township, Murray County, Minnesota =

Belfast Township, Minnesota
- Township
- Location within the state of Minnesota Belfast Township, Minnesota (the United States)
- Coordinates: 43°53′4″N 95°31′58″W
- Country: United States
- State: Minnesota
- County: Murray

Area
  - Total: 36.0 sq mi (93.2 km^{2})
  - Land: 35.9 sq mi (93.0 km^{2})
  - Water: 0.077 sq mi (0.2 km^{2})
- Elevation: 1,496 ft (456 m)

Population (2000)
  - Total: 195
  - Density: 5.4/sq mi (2.1/km^{2})
- Time zone: UTC-6 (Central (CST))
  - Summer (DST): UTC-5 (CDT)
- FIPS code: 27-04708
- GNIS feature ID: 0663549

Belfast Township is a township in Murray County, Minnesota, United States. The population was 195 at the 2000 census.

It was named after the city of Belfast in Northern Ireland. Prior to organization in 1878, this area was known as Creswell, after a local post office.

== Geography ==
According to the United States Census Bureau, the township has a total area of 36.0 square miles (93 km^{2}), of which 35.9 square miles (93 km^{2}) is land and 0.1 square miles (0.26 km^{2}) (0.22%) is water. Lime Creek is in Belfast.

== Demographics ==
As of the census of 2000, there were 195 people, 71 households, and 51 families residing in the township. The population density was 5.4 inhabitants per square mile (2.1/km^{2}). There were 81 housing units at an average density of 2.3 per square mile (0.89/km^{2}). The racial makeup of the township was 100.00% White.

There were 71 households, out of which 39.4% had children under the age of 18 living with them, 63.4% were married couples living together, 5.6% had a female householder with no husband present, and 26.8% were non-families. 23.9% of all households were made up of individuals, and 5.6% had someone living alone who was 65 years of age or older. The average household size was 2.75 and the average family size was 3.33.

In the township the population was spread out, with 34.9% under the age of 18, 3.1% from 18 to 24, 30.8% from 25 to 44, 21.5% from 45 to 64, and 9.7% who were 65 years of age or older. The median age was 36 years. For every 100 females, there were 129.4 males. For every 100 females age 18 and over, there were 126.8 males.

The median income for a household in the township was $34,375, and the median income for a family was $43,333. Males had a median income of $31,250 versus $21,250 for females. The per capita income for the township was $14,856. About 2.1% of families and 4.6% of the population were below the poverty line, including none of those under the age of eighteen and 12.0% of those 65 or over.

== Politics ==
Belfast Township is located in Minnesota's 1st congressional district, represented by Mankato educator Tim Walz, a Democrat. At the state level, Belfast Township is located in Senate District 22, represented by Republican Doug Magnus, and in House District 22A, represented by Republican Joe Schomacker.
