= Cottonwood County, Minnesota =

County in Minnesota, United States

- County
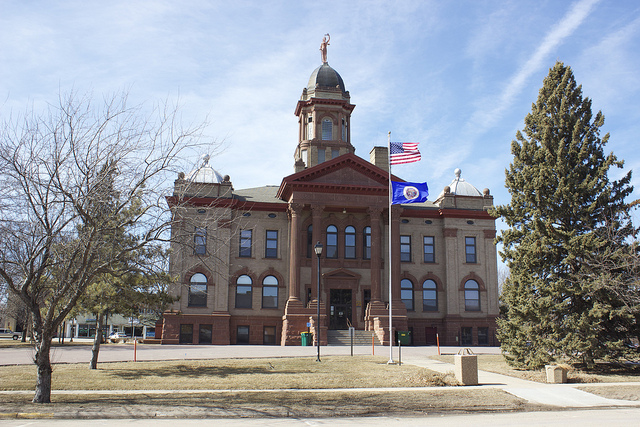
- Cottonwood County Courthouse

- Location within the U.S. state of Minnesota
- Coordinates: 44°01′N 95°11′W
- Country: United States
- State: Minnesota
- Created: May 23, 1857
- Organized: July 29, 1870
- Named for: Cottonwood River
- Seat: Windom
- Largest city: Windom

Area
  - Total: 649 sq mi (1,680 km^{2})
  - Land: 639 sq mi (1,660 km^{2})
  - Water: 10 sq mi (26 km^{2}) 1.5%

Population (2020)
  - Total: 11,517
  - Estimate (2025): 11,405 ▼
  - Density: 17.8/sq mi (6.9/km^{2})
- Time zone: UTC−6 (Central)
  - Summer (DST): UTC−5 (CDT)
- Congressional districts: 1st, 7th
- Website: www.cottonwoodcountymn.gov

Cottonwood County is a county in the U.S. state of Minnesota. As of the 2020 census, the population was 11,517. Its county seat is Windom.

== History ==
The county was created on May 23, 1857, named for the river in Germantown Township ("cottonwood" is the English meaning of the Dakota Sioux word "Waraju"). Minnesota Governor Horace Austin appointed three county commissioners when the county was established. They met at a home about six miles northwest of Windom on the Des Moines River at Big Bend. During this meeting, they designated the commissioners' districts and changed various county officers. The county organization was completed on July 29, 1870. The first general election was held in the county that November. The first deed of record was filed on January 10, 1870. The first land assessments were made in 1871, and the first taxes were paid in 1872.

Until May 1965, when county option was eliminated, Cottonwood was a dry county; no beverages with over 3.2% alcohol could be sold.

=== County NRHP listings ===
- The Cottonwood County Courthouse (1904), an example of Neoclassical architecture, is listed in the National Register of Historic Places.
- Mountain Park, southeast of Mountain Lake, has been listed on the National Register of Historic Places since 1973. A 1976 archeological dig unearthed evidence of a Meskwaki habitation there circa 500 B.C., the oldest human habitation to be discovered in Minnesota.
- The Jeffers Petroglyphs, near Jeffers, contain pre-European Native American rock carvings. Listed in the National Register of Historic Places.

Soils of Cottonwood County

== Geography ==
The Heron Lake Outflow flows east through the lower part of Cottonwood County. The county terrain consists of low rolling hills, devoted to agriculture. The terrain generally slopes to the east, with the northern portion also sloping north and the lower portion sloping south. The highest point is on the midpoint of the west border, at 1,535 ft (468 m) ASL. The county has an area of 649 square miles (1,680 km^{2}), of which 639 square miles (1,660 km^{2}) is land and 10 square miles (26 km^{2}) (1.5%) is water.

=== Watersheds ===
The northeastern part of the county drains north to the Minnesota River through numerous small creeks, the Cottonwood River and Watonwan River. The southwestern part drains south through the Des Moines River. These two watersheds come together at the Mississippi River near Keokuk, Iowa. Most wetlands in the county have been drained for agricultural use.

=== Lakes ===
Des Moines River Watershed
- Clear Lake: in Lakeside Township
- Clear Lake South and North: North is drained and South is mostly in Southbrook Township, but the far southern side stretches into Jackson County
- Cottonwood Lake: eastern two thirds in Lakeside Township; western third in Great Bend Township
- Harder Lake: in Dale Township
- Lenhart Lake (Drained): Dale Township
- Talcot Lake: mostly in Southbrook Township, but the far western side stretches into Murray County
- Oaks Lake: mostly in Southbrook Township, but the northern quarter is in Rose Hill Township
- String Lakes: mostly in Great Bend Township, but the southern tip is in Jackson County
- Warren Lake: in Great Bend Township
- Wilson Lake (Drained): Dale Township
- Wolf Lake: in Lakeside Township
Minnesota River Watershed
- Arnolds Lake: in Dale Township
- Augusta Lake: in Amo Township
- Bartsh Lake: in Carson Township
- Bat Lake (see Rat Lake)
- Bean Lake: in Westbrook Township
- Bennett Slough: Lakeside Township
- Berry Lake (Drained): Rose Hill Township
- Bingham Lake: in Lakeside Township
- Bolstad Slough: Lakeside Township
- Carey Lake: in Rose Hill Township
- Clear Lake: there is a third Clear Lake in Westbrook Township
- Double Lake: in Westbrook Township
- Eagle Lake: in Carson Township
- Fish Lake: northern third in Lakeside Township; southern two thirds in Jackson County
- Fowlers Slough (Drained): Rose Hill Township
- Hurricane Lake: mostly in Highwater Township but the far western tip is in Westbrook Township and the southern third is in Storden Township
- Long Lake: in Carson Township
- Long Lake: there is another Long Lake in Rose Hill Township
- Maiden Lake: in Carson Township
- Mountain Lake: in Midway Township
- Mountain Lake (Drained): Mountain Lake Township
- Mud Lake (Drained): Rose Hill Township
- Parso Lake: in Lakeside Township
- Rat Lake: in Carson Township
- Rat Lake (Drained): Westbrook Township
- Regehr Slough: Mountain Lake Township
- Unnamed Lake: Westbrook Township 13
- Round Lake: Rose Hill Township
- Swan Lake: in Dale Township
- Zorn Lake (Drained): Rose Hill Township

=== Major highways ===
- U.S. Highway 71
- Minnesota State Highway 30
- Minnesota State Highway 60
- Minnesota State Highway 62

=== Adjacent counties ===
- Redwood County - north
- Brown County - northeast
- Watonwan County - east
- Jackson County - south
- Nobles County - southwest
- Murray County -west

=== Protected areas ===
- Arnolds Lake WMA
- Banks WMA
- Bennett WMA
- Blixseth WPA
- Budolfson WMA
- Carpenter WMA
- Clear Lake WPA
- Cottonwood Lake WPA
- Delft State Wildlife Management Area
- Des Moines River WPA
- Dynamite Park
- Expandere WMA
- Farhagen WMA
- Harder Lake WPA
- Hurricane Lake WMA
- Lady Bird County Park
- Lake Augusta WPA
- Little Swan Lake State Wildlife Management Area
- Long Lake WPA
- Mound Creek County Park
- Mountain County Park
- Mountain Lake WMA
- Mountain Lake WPA
- Pats Grove County Park
- Pats Pasture WMA
- Pennington Prairie SNA
- Regehr State Wildlife Management Area
- Red Rock Falls County Park
- Rock Ridge Prairie Scientific and Natural Area
- Rock Ridge WMA
- South Dutch Charlie County Park
- String Lakes WMA
- Storden WPA
- Talcot County Park
- Talcot Lake WMA
- Typhoon WMA
- Voit WMA
- Watonwan WPA
- Wolf Lake WPA

== Demographics ==
Historical population
Census	Pop.	Note	%±
1860	12		—
1870	534		4,350.0%
1880	5,533		936.1%
1890	7,412		34.0%
1900	12,069		62.8%
1910	12,651		4.8%
1920	14,570		15.2%
1930	14,782		1.5%
1940	16,143		9.2%
1950	15,763		−2.4%
1960	16,166		2.6%
1970	14,887		−7.9%
1980	14,854		−0.2%
1990	12,694		−14.5%
2000	12,167		−4.2%
2010	11,687		−3.9%
2020	11,517		−1.5%
2025 (est.)	11,405	▼	−1.0%
U.S. Decennial Census:

=== Racial and ethnic composition ===
Cottonwood County, Minnesota – Racial and ethnic composition Note: the US Census treats Hispanic/Latino as an ethnic category. This table excludes Latinos from the racial categories and assigns them to a separate category. Hispanics/Latinos may be of any race.
Race / Ethnicity (NH = Non-Hispanic)	Pop 1980	Pop 1990	Pop 2000	Pop 2010	Pop 2020	% 1980	% 1990	% 2000	% 2010	% 2020
White alone (NH)	14,756	12,520	11,509	10,432	9,418	99.34%	98.63%	94.59%	89.26%	81.77%
Black or African American alone (NH)	8	8	39	82	135	0.05%	0.06%	0.32%	0.70%	1.17%
Native American or Alaska Native alone (NH)	12	10	26	23	25	0.08%	0.08%	0.21%	0.20%	0.22%
Asian alone (NH)	35	88	197	302	361	0.24%	0.69%	1.62%	2.58%	3.13%
Native Hawaiian or Pacific Islander alone (NH)	x	x	7	17	80	x	x	0.06%	0.15%	0.69%
Other race alone (NH)	2	5	12	6	53	0.01%	0.04%	0.10%	0.05%	0.46%
Mixed race or Multiracial (NH)	x	x	110	105	330	x	x	0.90%	0.90%	2.87%
Hispanic or Latino (any race)	41	63	267	720	1,115	0.28%	0.50%	2.19%	6.16%	9.68%
Total	14,854	12,694	12,167	11,687	11,517	100.00%	100.00%	100.00%	100.00%	100.00%

=== 2020 census ===
As of the 2020 census, the county had a population of 11,517. The median age was 42.5 years. 23.9% of residents were under the age of 18 and 23.0% of residents were 65 years of age or older. For every 100 females there were 100.1 males, and for every 100 females age 18 and over there were 98.7 males age 18 and over.

The racial makeup of the county was 83.5% White, 1.2% Black or African American, 0.4% American Indian and Alaska Native, 3.2% Asian, 0.7% Native Hawaiian and Pacific Islander, 5.9% from some other race, and 5.0% from two or more races. Hispanic or Latino residents of any race comprised 9.7% of the population.

<0.1% of residents lived in urban areas, while 100.0% lived in rural areas.

There were 4,671 households in the county, of which 28.0% had children under the age of 18 living in them. Of all households, 50.7% were married-couple households, 19.5% were households with a male householder and no spouse or partner present, and 23.4% were households with a female householder and no spouse or partner present. About 31.8% of all households were made up of individuals and 14.6% had someone living alone who was 65 years of age or older.

There were 5,152 housing units, of which 9.3% were vacant. Among occupied housing units, 76.9% were owner-occupied and 23.1% were renter-occupied. The homeowner vacancy rate was 2.1% and the rental vacancy rate was 7.9%.

=== 2000 census ===
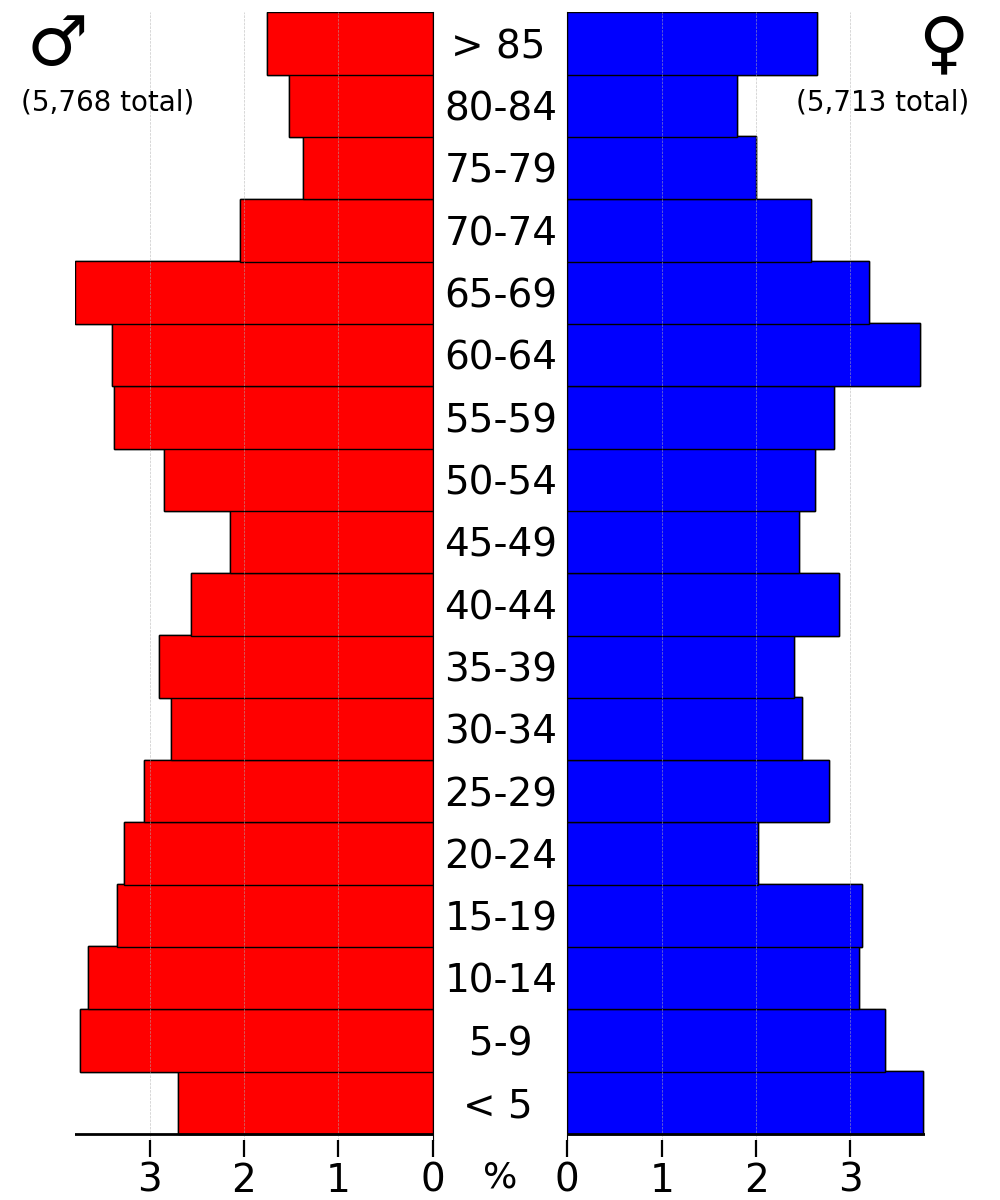
2022 US Census population pyramid for Cottonwood County, from ACS 5-year estimates

As of the census of 2000, there were 12,167 people, 4,917 households, and 3,338 families in the county. The population density was 19.0 per square mile (7.3/km^{2}). There were 5,376 housing units at an average density of 8.41 per square mile (3.25/km^{2}). The racial makeup of the county was 95.23% White, 0.34% Black or African American, 0.23% Native American, 1.63% Asian, 0.08% Pacific Islander, 1.35% from other races, and 1.14% from two or more races. 2.19% of the population were Hispanic or Latino of any race. 50.2% were of German and 18.6% Norwegian ancestry.

There were 4,917 households, out of which 28.60% had children under the age of 18 living with them, 58.10% were married couples living together, 6.90% had a female householder with no husband present, and 32.10% were non-families. 28.90% of all households were made up of individuals, and 15.90% had someone living alone who was 65 years of age or older. The average household size was 2.39 and the average family size was 2.94.

The county population contained 25.00% under the age of 18, 6.50% from 18 to 24, 23.20% from 25 to 44, 23.20% from 45 to 64, and 22.10% who were 65 years of age or older. The median age was 42 years. For every 100 females there were 94.50 males. For every 100 females age 18 and over, there were 91.50 males.

The median income for a household in the county was $31,943, and the median income for a family was $40,237. Males had a median income of $28,993 versus $19,934 for females. The per capita income for the county was $16,647. About 7.40% of families and 11.70% of the population were below the poverty line, including 18.40% of those under age 18 and 8.70% of those age 65 or over.

== Government and politics ==
Cottonwood County reliably votes Republican. In only one presidential election since 1964 has it selected the Democratic candidate.

United States presidential election results for Cottonwood County, Minnesota
Year	Republican		Democratic		Third party(ies)	
Year	No.	%	No.	%	No.	%
1892	727	52.38%	202	14.55%	459	33.07%
1896	1,242	58.72%	810	38.30%	63	2.98%
1900	1,368	68.50%	547	27.39%	82	4.11%
1904	1,536	84.44%	213	11.71%	70	3.85%
1908	1,240	65.82%	526	27.92%	118	6.26%
1912	325	16.11%	511	25.33%	1,181	58.55%
1916	1,425	60.23%	762	32.21%	179	7.57%
1920	3,882	86.27%	451	10.02%	167	3.71%
1924	2,722	56.99%	217	4.54%	1,837	38.46%
1928	3,405	67.45%	1,604	31.77%	39	0.77%
1932	1,921	39.40%	2,877	59.00%	78	1.60%
1936	2,509	37.88%	3,929	59.32%	185	2.79%
1940	4,228	58.28%	2,991	41.23%	36	0.50%
1944	3,916	62.08%	2,354	37.32%	38	0.60%
1948	3,222	48.58%	3,333	50.26%	77	1.16%
1952	5,488	71.51%	2,130	27.76%	56	0.73%
1956	4,619	66.29%	2,344	33.64%	5	0.07%
1960	5,087	64.62%	2,768	35.16%	17	0.22%
1964	3,423	45.47%	4,090	54.33%	15	0.20%
1968	4,050	54.80%	3,046	41.21%	295	3.99%
1972	4,396	60.19%	2,802	38.37%	105	1.44%
1976	3,906	49.70%	3,813	48.52%	140	1.78%
1980	4,258	54.26%	2,958	37.70%	631	8.04%
1984	4,275	57.89%	3,073	41.61%	37	0.50%
1988	3,390	51.80%	3,095	47.29%	60	0.92%
1992	2,481	37.30%	2,382	35.81%	1,788	26.88%
1996	2,633	42.66%	2,737	44.35%	802	12.99%
2000	3,369	54.51%	2,503	40.50%	309	5.00%
2004	3,557	55.85%	2,726	42.80%	86	1.35%
2008	3,157	52.30%	2,759	45.71%	120	1.99%
2012	3,316	56.57%	2,433	41.50%	113	1.93%
2016	3,679	64.31%	1,678	29.33%	364	6.36%
2020	4,165	68.20%	1,834	30.03%	108	1.77%
2024	4,157	69.42%	1,705	28.47%	126	2.10%

County Board of Commissioners
Position	Name	District
Commissioner	Larry Anderson	District 1
Commissioner and Chairperson	Kevin Stevens	District 2
Commissioner	Donna Gravley	District 3
Commissioner	Norman Holven	District 4
Commissioner	Tom Appel	District 5

State Legislature (2018-2020)
Position	Name	Affiliation	District
Senate	Bill Weber	Republican	District 22
House of Representatives	Rod Hamilton	Republican	District 22B

U.S Congress (2021-2023)
Position	Name	Affiliation	District
House of Representatives	Brad Finstad	Republican	1st
House of Representatives	Michelle Fischbach	Republican	7th
Senate	Amy Klobuchar	Democrat	N/A
Senate	Tina Smith	Democrat	N/A

== Communities ==
=== Cities ===
- Bingham Lake
- Comfrey (partial)
- Jeffers
- Mountain Lake
- Storden
- Westbrook
- Windom (county seat)

=== Unincorporated community ===
- Delft

=== Townships ===
- Amboy Township
- Amo Township
- Ann Township
- Carson Township
- Dale Township
- Delton Township
- Germantown Township
- Great Bend Township
- Highwater Township
- Lakeside Township
- Midway Township
- Mountain Lake Township
- Rose Hill Township
- Selma Township
- Southbrook Township
- Springfield Township
- Storden Township
- Westbrook Township

== See also ==
- National Register of Historic Places listings in Cottonwood County, Minnesota
- List of Minnesota placenames of Native American origin
