= Jim Hagedorn =

American politician (1962–2022)

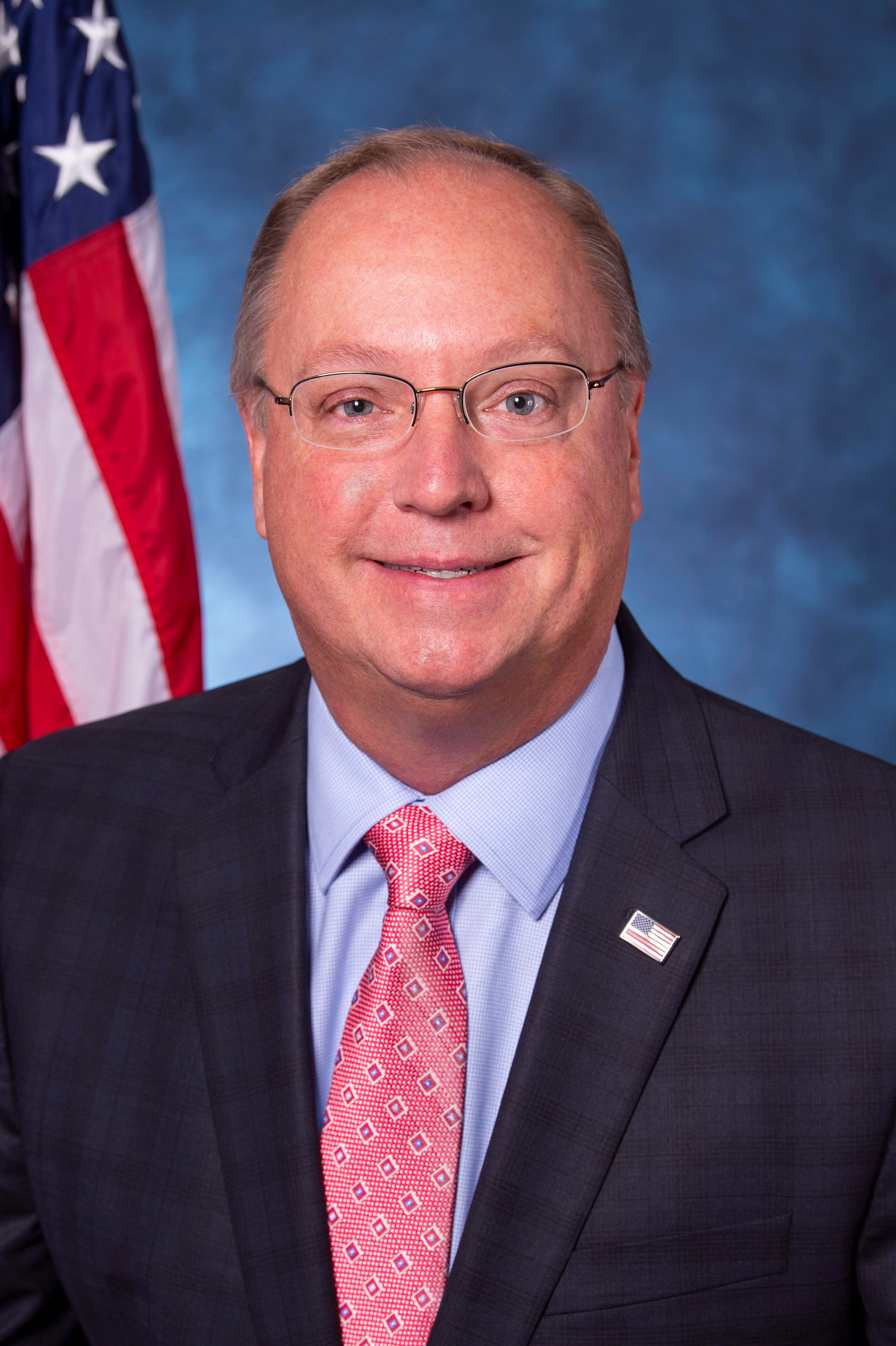

Member of the U.S. House of Representatives from Minnesota's 1st district
- In office January 3, 2019 – February 17, 2022
- Preceded by: Tim Walz
- Succeeded by: Brad Finstad

Personal details
- Born: James Lee Hagedorn; August 4, 1962 Blue Earth, Minnesota, U.S.
- Died: February 17, 2022 (aged 59) Rochester, Minnesota, U.S.
- Resting place: Riverside Cemetery; Blue Earth, Minnesota, U.S.
- Party: Republican
- Spouse: Jennifer Carnahan (m. 2018)
- Relatives: Tom Hagedorn (father)
- Education: George Mason University (BA)

James Lee Hagedorn (/ˈhæɡɛdɔːrn/ HAG-e-dorn; August 4, 1962 – February 17, 2022) was an American politician who served as the U.S. representative for Minnesota's 1st congressional district from 2019 until his death in 2022. He was a member of the Republican Party. The district stretches across southern Minnesota along the border with Iowa and includes Rochester, Austin, and Mankato.

Hagedorn lost to future Governor of Minnesota Tim Walz in 2014 and 2016.

== Early life and education ==
Hagedorn was born in Blue Earth, Minnesota, in 1962, the son of former U.S. Representative Tom Hagedorn and Kathleen Hagedorn (née Mittlestadt). He was raised on his family's farm near Truman, Minnesota, and in McLean, Virginia, near Washington, D.C., while his father served in Congress from 1975 to 1983. Hagedorn graduated from Langley High School.

He graduated from George Mason University with a Bachelor of Arts degree in government and political science in 1993.

== Early political career ==
=== Government career ===
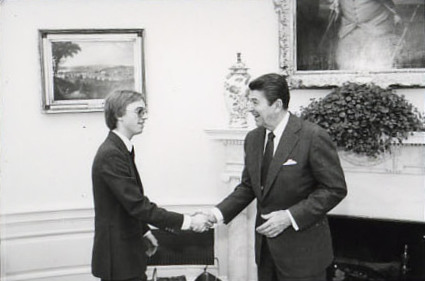
Hagedorn greeting President Ronald Reagan in 1982

Hagedorn served as a legislative aide to U.S. Representative Arlan Stangeland from 1984 to 1991. He then worked in the United States Department of the Treasury as director for legislative and public affairs for the Financial Management Service from 1991 to 1998 and as congressional affairs officer for the Bureau of Engraving and Printing until 2009.

=== Mr. Conservative blog ===
From 2002 to 2008, Hagedorn authored a now-deleted blog, Mr. Conservative. According to Mother Jones, the blog made Native Americans a "favorite punching bag" and commented on female Supreme Court justices and Barack Obama's ancestry "in ways many voters won't appreciate." Hagedorn said the blog was intended to be humorous and satirical.

Hagedorn's blogging history led the conservative newspaper the Washington Examiner to run an editorial calling him "the worst midterm candidate in America" in 2018.

== U.S. House of Representatives ==
=== Elections ===
==== 2010 ====
Hagedorn lost the Republican nomination for Minnesota's 1st congressional district in the 2010 election.

==== 2014 ====
Returning to Minnesota in 2013, he won the Republican nomination, but lost to Democratic incumbent Tim Walz.

2014 Republican primary results
Party	Candidate	Votes	%
Republican	Jim Hagedorn	12,748	54.0
Republican	Aaron Miller	10,870	46.0

Minnesota's 1st congressional district, 2014
Party	Candidate	Votes	%
Democratic (DFL)	Tim Walz (incumbent)	122,851	54.2
Republican	Jim Hagedorn	103,536	45.7
Write-in		308	0.1

==== 2016 ====
Hagedorn again won the Republican nomination, and again lost to Walz in a closer race.

2016 Republican primary results
Party	Candidate	Votes	%
Republican	Jim Hagedorn	10,851	76.5
Republican	Steve Williams	3,330	23.5

Minnesota's 1st congressional district, 2016
Party	Candidate	Votes	%
Democratic (DFL)	Tim Walz (incumbent)	169,074	50.3
Republican	Jim Hagedorn	166,526	49.6
Write-in		277	0.1

==== 2018 ====
Hagedorn received the Republican nomination, despite the NRA Political Victory Fund endorsing another candidate, state Senator Carla Nelson, who also received funds from Representative Elise Stefanik, Richard Uihlein and Paul Singer. Hagedorn described himself as the most conservative candidate, who was loyal to Donald Trump.

2018 Republican primary results
Party	Candidate	Votes	%
Republican	Jim Hagedorn	25,418	60.1
Republican	Carla Nelson	13,589	32.2
Republican	Steve Williams	2,145	5.1
Republican	Andrew Candler	1,106	2.6

After Hagedorn won the primary, then-head of the National Republican Congressional Committee, Representative Steve Stivers, said of the viewpoints expressed on Hagedorn's blog, "that is news to me". The NRCC spokeswoman said the posts were inappropriate and not condoned by the group.

In the general election, with Walz giving up the seat to run for governor of Minnesota, Hagedorn defeated Democratic nominee Daniel Feehan, a former Department of Defense official, in a very close race.

Minnesota's 1st congressional district, 2018
Party	Candidate	Votes	%
Republican	Jim Hagedorn	146,199	50.1
Democratic (DFL)	Dan Feehan	144,884	49.7
Write-in		575	0.2

==== 2020 ====
Hagedorn was reelected in 2020, narrowly defeating Feehan again.

Minnesota's 1st congressional district, 2020
Party	Candidate	Votes	%
Republican	Jim Hagedorn (incumbent)	179,234	48.6
Democratic (DFL)	Dan Feehan	167,890	45.5
Grassroots	Bill Rood	21,448	5.8
Write-in		284	0.1

=== Tenure ===
According to the McCourt School of Public Policy at Georgetown University, Hagedorn held a Bipartisan Index Score of -0.0 in the 116th United States Congress for 2019, placing him 190th out of 435 members. Based on FiveThirtyEight's congressional vote tracker at ABC News, Hagedorn voted with Donald Trump's stated public policy positions 94.4% of the time, making him average in the 116th United States Congress according to predictive scoring (district partisanship and voting record).

==== Depictions of Jesus ====
In 2020, in response to activist Shaun King saying that depictions of Jesus as white should be destroyed, Hagedorn wrote that the Democratic Party and Black Lives Matter movement "are at war with our country, our beliefs and western culture." In response to critiques that the term "Western culture" has been used to promote white nationalism, Hagedorn said, "The notion that statues and images of Jesus Christ somehow represent white supremacy and should be destroyed is ludicrous and represent a growing intolerant movement on the left to silence any voices that do not align with their radical secular views." His comments led several corporate donors, including Intel and UnitedHealth Group, to ask him to return their donations.

==== Office funding ====
In 2020, LegiStorm released an analysis of Hagedorn's office spending, finding that the office had spent more than one fifth of its $1.4 million annual office budget on publicly funded constituent mail. Around 40% of his office's annual budget was spent in the first quarter of 2020, surpassing any other member of Congress during the same time period. Some expenses for Hagedorn's mailings went to a firm partially owned by a part-time Hagedorn staffer. Hagedorn initiated an internal review of his office's spending and reported the findings to the House Ethics Committee, which declined to pursue the matter. As a result of the internal review, Hagedorn dismissed his chief of staff and said, "I acknowledge responsibility for the oversight of my office and will continue to make any necessary management improvements."

In October 2020, Politico alleged that Hagedorn "appears to have enjoyed rent-free use of a campaign office supplied by a political donor." Hagedorn denied the report, saying his campaign had leased a post office box and not office space in the building in question.

==== Contesting election results ====
In December 2020, Hagedorn was one of 126 Republican members of the House of Representatives to sign an amicus brief in support of Texas v. Pennsylvania, a lawsuit filed at the United States Supreme Court contesting the results of the 2020 presidential election, in which Joe Biden defeated Donald Trump. The Supreme Court declined to hear the case on the basis that Texas lacked standing under Article III of the Constitution to challenge the results of an election held by another state.

On January 7, 2021, Hagedorn objected to the certification of the 2020 presidential election results in Congress based on false claims of voter fraud.

==== Financial disclosures ====
In December 2021, Business Insider reported that Hagedorn had violated the Stop Trading on Congressional Knowledge (STOCK) Act of 2012, a federal transparency and conflict-of-interest law, by failing to properly disclose a sale of stock in Exact Sciences Corp. that he made in 2020.

=== Committee assignments ===
- Committee on Agriculture
  - Subcommittee on Livestock and Foreign Agriculture
  - Subcommittee on Nutrition, Oversight, and Department Operations
- Committee on Small Business
  - Subcommittee on Rural Development, Agriculture, Trade and Entrepreneurship
  - Subcommittee on Contracting and Workforce

=== Caucus memberships ===
- Republican Study Committee

== Personal life ==
Hagedorn was married to Jennifer Carnahan, who chaired the Republican Party of Minnesota until 2021. They lived in Blue Earth, Minnesota.

Hagedorn was Lutheran.

=== Health and death ===
Hagedorn was diagnosed with stage 4 kidney cancer in 2019 and received immunotherapy. In December 2020, he underwent surgery to remove the diseased kidney. In July 2021, Hagedorn announced that his cancer had returned.

In January 2022, Hagedorn was admitted to the Mayo Clinic Hospital in Rochester, Minnesota, after testing positive for COVID-19; he had previously been vaccinated against the disease. Hagedorn died on February 17, 2022, at the age of 59. He was buried at Riverside Cemetery in Blue Earth.

== See also ==
- List of members of the United States Congress who died in office (2000–present)#2020s

U.S. House of Representatives
Preceded by Tim Walz	Member of the U.S. House of Representatives from Minnesota's 1st congressional district 2019–2022	Succeeded by Brad Finstad
