= 1992 United States presidential election in Minnesota =

- November 3, 1992
- Turnout: 73.91% (▲5.07 pp)

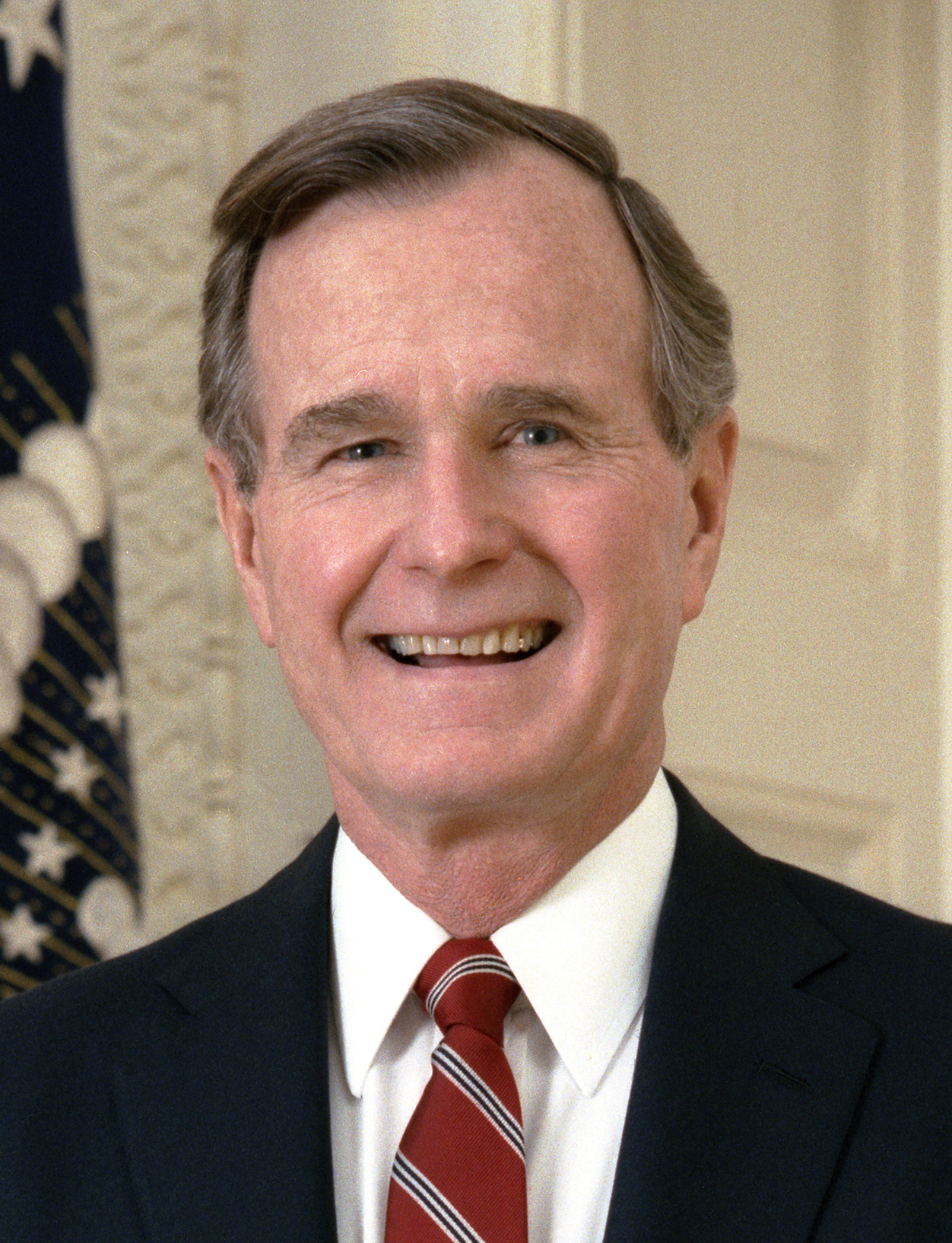

Nominee	Bill Clinton	George H. W. Bush	Ross Perot
Party	Democratic (DFL)	Ind.-Republican	Independent
Home state	Arkansas	Texas	Texas
Running mate	Al Gore	Dan Quayle	James Stockdale
Electoral vote	10	0	0
Popular vote	1,020,997	747,841	562,506
Percentage	43.48%	31.85%	23.96%

Clinton
20–30%
30–40%
40–50%
50–60%
60–70%
70–80%
80–90%
90–100%
Bush
20–30%
30–40%
40–50%
50–60%
60–70%
70–80%
80–90%
90–100%
Perot
30–40%
40–50%
50–60%
60–70%
70–80%
90–100%
Other
30–40%
Tie/no data
President before election
George H. W. Bush
Republican
Elected President
Bill Clinton
Democratic (DFL)

The 1992 United States presidential election in Minnesota took place on November 3, 1992, as part of the 1992 United States presidential election. Voters chose ten representatives, or electors, to the Electoral College, who voted for president and vice president.

Minnesota was won by Governor Bill Clinton (D-Arkansas) with 43.48% of the popular vote over incumbent President George H. W. Bush (R-Texas) who took 31.85%, a victory margin of 11.63%. Businessman Ross Perot (I-Texas) finished third, with 23.96% of the popular vote. Clinton ultimately won the national vote, defeating incumbent President Bush.

April 7, 1992 saw the first presidential primary in Minnesota since 1956. Clinton won a plurality of votes in the DFL primary, and Bush won in the IR election.

Clinton became the first Democrat to win the White House without carrying Lyon or Roseau counties since Woodrow Wilson in 1912, as well as the first to do so without carrying Becker County since Woodrow Wilson in 1916.

== Results ==
1992 United States presidential election in Minnesota
Party	Candidate	Votes	Percentage	Electoral votes
Democratic (DFL)	Bill Clinton	1,020,997	43.48%	10
Republican	George H. W. Bush (incumbent)	747,841	31.85%	0
Independent	Ross Perot	562,506	23.96%	0
Libertarian	Andre Marrou	3,374	0.14%	0
America First	James "Bo" Gritz	3,363	0.14%	0
Grassroots	Jack Herer	2,659	0.11%	0
Write-ins		2,499	0.11%	0
Natural Law	John Hagelin	1,406	0.06%	0
Socialist Workers	James Warren	990	0.04%	0
New Alliance	Lenora Fulani	958	0.04%	0
U.S. Taxpayers'	Howard Phillips	733	0.03%	0
Democrats for Economic Recovery	Lyndon LaRouche	622	0.03%	0
Totals		2,347,948	100.0%	10

=== Results by county ===
County	Bill Clinton DFL		George H.W. Bush Republican		Ross Perot Independent		Various candidates Other parties		Margin		Total votes cast
County	#	%	#	%	#	%	#	%	#	%	Total votes cast
Aitkin	3,400	44.98%	2,151	28.46%	1,951	25.81%	57	0.75%	1,249	16.52%	7,559
Anoka	54,621	42.01%	39,458	30.35%	35,140	27.03%	801	0.62%	15,163	11.66%	130,020
Becker	4,958	36.18%	5,430	39.63%	3,238	23.63%	76	0.55%	-472	-3.45%	13,702
Beltrami	7,210	45.10%	5,204	32.55%	3,473	21.72%	100	0.63%	2,006	12.55%	15,987
Benton	5,156	35.88%	5,053	35.16%	4,048	28.17%	114	0.79%	103	0.72%	14,371
Big Stone	1,610	47.08%	1,052	30.76%	740	21.64%	18	0.53%	558	16.32%	3,420
Blue Earth	11,531	41.41%	8,813	31.65%	7,299	26.21%	204	0.73%	2,718	9.76%	27,847
Brown	4,278	31.41%	5,390	39.57%	3,845	28.23%	108	0.79%	-1,112	-8.16%	13,621
Carlton	7,736	52.46%	3,922	26.60%	3,005	20.38%	84	0.57%	3,814	25.86%	14,747
Carver	8,349	31.38%	10,201	38.34%	7,942	29.85%	112	0.42%	-1,852	-6.96%	26,604
Cass	4,901	40.18%	4,276	35.06%	2,939	24.10%	81	0.66%	625	5.12%	12,197
Chippewa	2,929	44.26%	2,143	32.39%	1,505	22.74%	40	0.60%	786	11.87%	6,617
Chisago	7,077	41.34%	4,813	28.11%	5,098	29.78%	131	0.77%	1,979 (Note: In this county where Bush ran third behind Clinton and Perot, margin given is Clinton vote minus Perot vote and percentage margin Clinton percentage minus Perot percentage.)	11.56%	17,119
Clay	9,845	41.93%	9,666	41.17%	3,835	16.33%	132	0.56%	179	0.76%	23,478
Clearwater	1,587	42.23%	1,315	34.99%	841	22.38%	15	0.40%	272	7.24%	3,758
Cook	1,005	38.39%	878	33.54%	704	26.89%	31	1.18%	127	4.85%	2,618
Cottonwood	2,382	35.81%	2,481	37.30%	1,749	26.30%	39	0.59%	-99	-1.49%	6,651
Crow Wing	8,896	36.25%	9,112	37.13%	6,367	25.95%	164	0.67%	-216	-0.88%	24,539
Dakota	63,660	40.53%	52,312	33.30%	40,244	25.62%	864	0.55%	11,348	7.23%	157,080
Dodge	2,620	32.87%	3,049	38.25%	2,231	27.99%	72	0.90%	-429	-5.38%	7,972
Douglas	5,252	33.12%	6,356	40.08%	4,138	26.09%	113	0.71%	-1,104	-6.96%	15,859
Faribault	3,339	36.51%	3,439	37.60%	2,322	25.39%	46	0.50%	-100	-1.09%	9,146
Fillmore	3,977	37.31%	3,583	33.62%	3,011	28.25%	87	0.82%	394	3.69%	10,658
Freeborn	7,759	43.56%	5,089	28.57%	4,878	27.38%	87	0.49%	2,670	14.99%	17,813
Goodhue	7,916	37.25%	7,321	34.45%	5,790	27.25%	223	1.05%	595	2.80%	21,250
Grant	1,561	42.58%	1,201	32.76%	885	24.14%	19	0.52%	360	9.82%	3,666
Hennepin	278,648	47.50%	179,581	30.61%	123,659	21.08%	4,731	0.81%	99,067	16.89%	586,619
Houston	3,744	35.82%	3,853	36.87%	2,697	25.81%	157	1.50%	-109	-1.05%	10,451
Hubbard	3,362	39.14%	3,227	37.57%	1,949	22.69%	51	0.59%	135	1.57%	8,589
Isanti	5,386	40.30%	3,988	29.84%	3,898	29.16%	94	0.70%	1,398	10.46%	13,366
Itasca	9,621	46.17%	5,952	28.56%	5,147	24.70%	118	0.57%	3,669	17.61%	20,838
Jackson	2,481	39.68%	1,824	29.17%	1,918	30.68%	29	0.46%	563	9.00%	6,252
Kanabec	2,532	40.27%	1,876	29.83%	1,836	29.20%	44	0.70%	656	10.44%	6,288
Kandiyohi	7,914	40.26%	6,784	34.51%	4,869	24.77%	89	0.45%	1,130	5.75%	19,656
Kittson	1,307	43.80%	1,098	36.80%	558	18.70%	21	0.70%	209	7.00%	2,984
Koochiching	3,474	46.54%	1,954	26.18%	1,993	26.70%	44	0.59%	1,481	19.84%	7,465
Lac qui Parle	2,342	47.14%	1,435	28.88%	1,163	23.41%	28	0.56%	907	18.26%	4,968
Lake	3,415	53.72%	1,465	23.05%	1,437	22.61%	40	0.63%	1,950	30.67%	6,357
Lake of the Woods	794	36.12%	762	34.67%	629	28.62%	13	0.59%	32	1.45%	2,198
Le Sueur	4,662	39.00%	3,858	32.27%	3,363	28.13%	71	0.59%	804	6.73%	11,954
Lincoln	1,555	42.77%	1,084	29.81%	967	26.60%	30	0.83%	471	12.96%	3,636
Lyon	4,481	36.36%	4,591	37.25%	3,180	25.80%	72	0.58%	-110	-0.89%	12,324
Mahnomen	1,035	43.32%	854	35.75%	483	20.22%	17	0.71%	181	7.57%	2,389
Marshall	2,309	39.79%	2,136	36.81%	1,306	22.51%	52	0.90%	173	2.98%	5,803
Martin	4,019	34.62%	4,438	38.23%	3,089	26.61%	63	0.54%	-419	-3.61%	11,609
McLeod	4,919	32.05%	5,422	35.33%	4,933	32.14%	73	0.48%	489 (Note: In this county where Clinton ran third behind Bush and Perot, margin given is Bush vote minus Perot vote and percentage margin Bush percentage minus Perot percentage.)	3.19%	15,347
Meeker	3,861	36.63%	3,497	33.18%	3,120	29.60%	62	0.59%	364	3.45%	10,540
Mille Lacs	3,648	39.85%	2,814	30.74%	2,615	28.57%	77	0.84%	834	9.11%	9,154
Morrison	5,588	38.69%	5,038	34.88%	3,710	25.69%	106	0.73%	550	3.81%	14,442
Mower	9,935	49.16%	5,147	25.47%	5,001	24.75%	127	0.63%	4,788	23.69%	20,210
Murray	1,993	38.23%	1,609	30.87%	1,588	30.46%	23	0.44%	384	7.36%	5,213
Nicollet	6,055	40.26%	5,091	33.85%	3,799	25.26%	94	0.63%	964	6.41%	15,039
Nobles	3,756	37.82%	3,548	35.73%	2,586	26.04%	40	0.40%	208	2.09%	9,930
Norman	1,784	43.29%	1,541	37.39%	776	18.83%	20	0.49%	243	5.90%	4,121
Olmsted	19,039	33.60%	23,404	41.30%	13,806	24.37%	413	0.73%	-4,365	-7.70%	56,662
Otter Tail	9,176	34.41%	11,074	41.52%	6,274	23.52%	146	0.55%	-1,898	-7.11%	26,670
Pennington	2,578	40.54%	2,155	33.89%	1,598	25.13%	28	0.44%	423	6.65%	6,359
Pine	4,929	45.58%	2,841	26.27%	2,952	27.30%	91	0.84%	1,977	18.28%	10,813
Pipestone	1,773	34.29%	1,953	37.78%	1,429	27.64%	15	0.29%	-180	-3.49%	5,170
Polk	5,850	39.17%	5,817	38.95%	3,176	21.27%	91	0.61%	33	0.22%	14,934
Pope	2,619	43.87%	1,886	31.59%	1,390	23.28%	75	1.26%	733	12.28%	5,970
Ramsey	130,932	51.97%	68,206	27.08%	50,757	20.15%	2,020	0.80%	62,726	24.89%	251,915
Red Lake	1,020	46.34%	691	31.39%	472	21.44%	18	0.82%	329	14.95%	2,201
Redwood	2,740	30.74%	3,408	38.24%	2,710	30.41%	55	0.62%	-668	-7.50%	8,913
Renville	3,414	38.27%	2,852	31.97%	2,598	29.13%	56	0.63%	562	6.30%	8,920
Rice	10,908	45.24%	7,015	29.09%	6,057	25.12%	133	0.55%	3,893	16.15%	24,113
Rock	2,006	37.58%	2,065	38.68%	1,244	23.30%	23	0.43%	-59	-1.10%	5,338
Roseau	2,346	32.27%	2,785	38.31%	2,099	28.88%	39	0.54%	-439	-6.04%	7,269
St. Louis	61,813	56.81%	24,579	22.59%	21,714	19.95%	709	0.65%	37,234	34.22%	108,815
Scott	11,225	34.84%	10,936	33.95%	9,881	30.67%	174	0.54%	289	0.89%	32,216
Sherburne	7,843	35.91%	7,339	33.60%	6,534	29.92%	125	0.57%	504	2.31%	21,841
Sibley	2,421	33.70%	2,315	32.22%	2,407	33.50%	42	0.58%	14	0.20%	7,185
Stearns	21,451	36.15%	22,502	37.92%	14,834	25.00%	553	0.93%	-1,051	-1.77%	59,340
Steele	5,152	32.63%	5,964	37.77%	4,542	28.77%	131	0.83%	-812	-5.14%	15,789
Stevens	2,466	42.40%	2,229	38.33%	1,086	18.67%	35	0.60%	237	4.07%	5,816
Swift	2,980	49.74%	1,603	26.76%	1,359	22.68%	49	0.82%	1,377	22.98%	5,991
Todd	4,059	36.55%	3,990	35.93%	2,976	26.80%	79	0.71%	69	0.62%	11,104
Traverse	1,053	42.39%	841	33.86%	582	23.43%	8	0.32%	212	8.53%	2,484
Wabasha	3,736	36.57%	3,397	33.25%	3,012	29.48%	72	0.70%	339	3.32%	10,217
Wadena	2,340	36.57%	2,492	38.95%	1,535	23.99%	31	0.48%	-152	-2.38%	6,398
Waseca	3,146	34.93%	3,118	34.62%	2,621	29.10%	121	1.34%	28	0.31%	9,006
Washington	35,820	41.90%	26,568	31.07%	22,585	26.42%	526	0.62%	9,252	10.83%	85,499
Watonwan	2,100	37.65%	1,871	33.54%	1,574	28.22%	33	0.59%	229	4.11%	5,578
Wilkin	1,122	31.97%	1,626	46.32%	748	21.31%	14	0.40%	-504	-14.35%	3,510
Winona	9,707	39.59%	8,585	35.02%	5,993	24.44%	233	0.95%	1,122	4.57%	24,518
Wright	12,465	35.45%	11,650	33.13%	10,829	30.80%	216	0.61%	815	2.32%	35,160
Yellow Medicine	2,593	41.87%	1,909	30.83%	1,645	26.56%	46	0.74%	684	11.04%	6,193
Totals	1,020,997	43.48%	747,841	31.85%	562,506	23.96%	16,604	0.71%	273,156	11.63%	2,347,948

==== Counties that flipped from Republican to Democratic ====
- Benton
- Cass
- Fillmore
- Goodhue
- Hubbard
- Lake of the Woods
- Le Sueur
- Meeker
- Morrison
- Nicollet
- Scott
- Sherburne
- Sibley
- Todd
- Wabasha
- Waseca
- Watonwan
- Winona
- Wright

== See also ==
- United States presidential elections in Minnesota
