= 2020 Minnesota Democratic presidential primary =

- March 3, 2020

91 Democratic National Convention delegates (75 pledged with 49 on district-level and 26 statewide; 16 unpledged) The number of pledged delegates won is determined by the popular vote

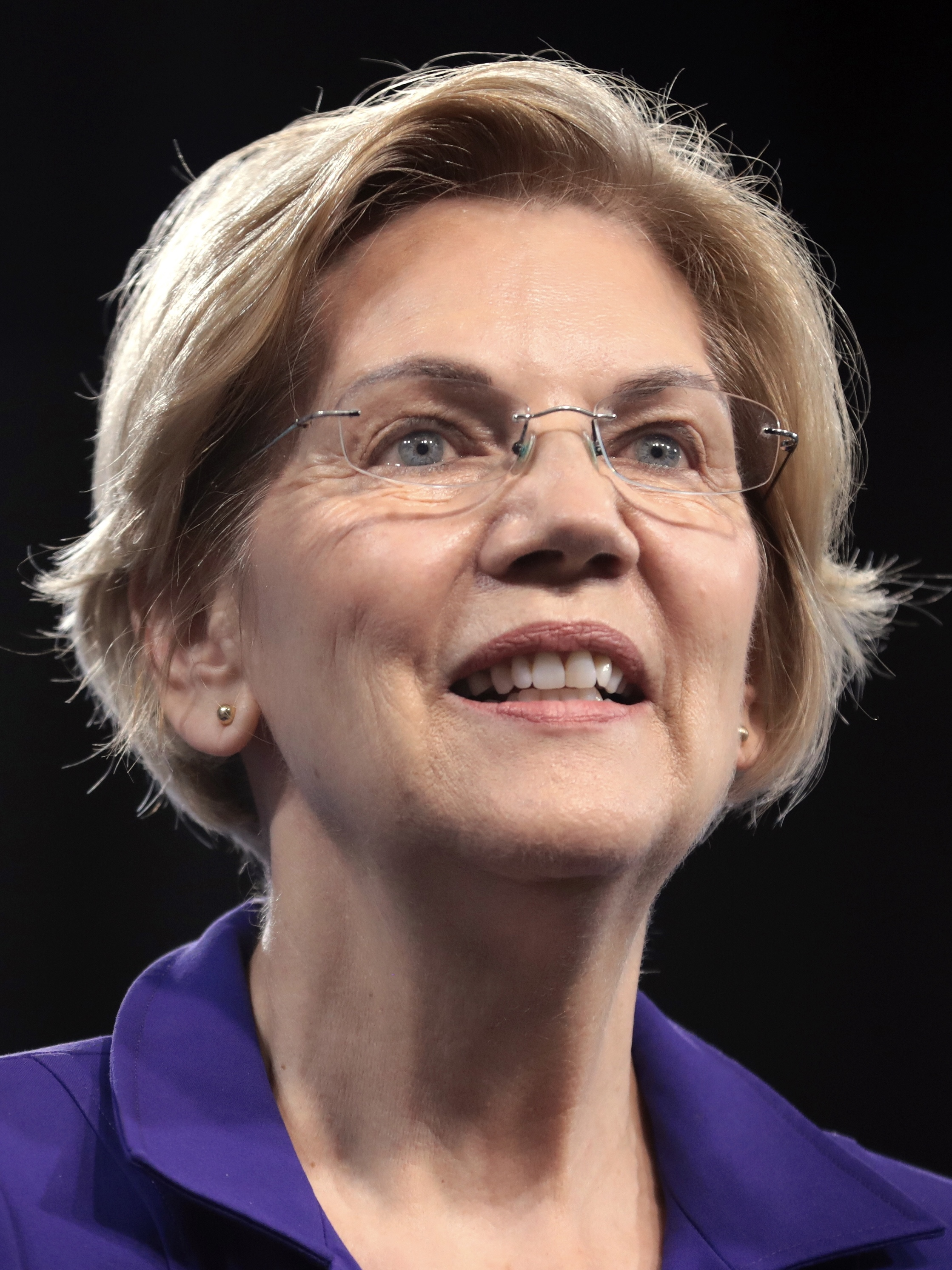

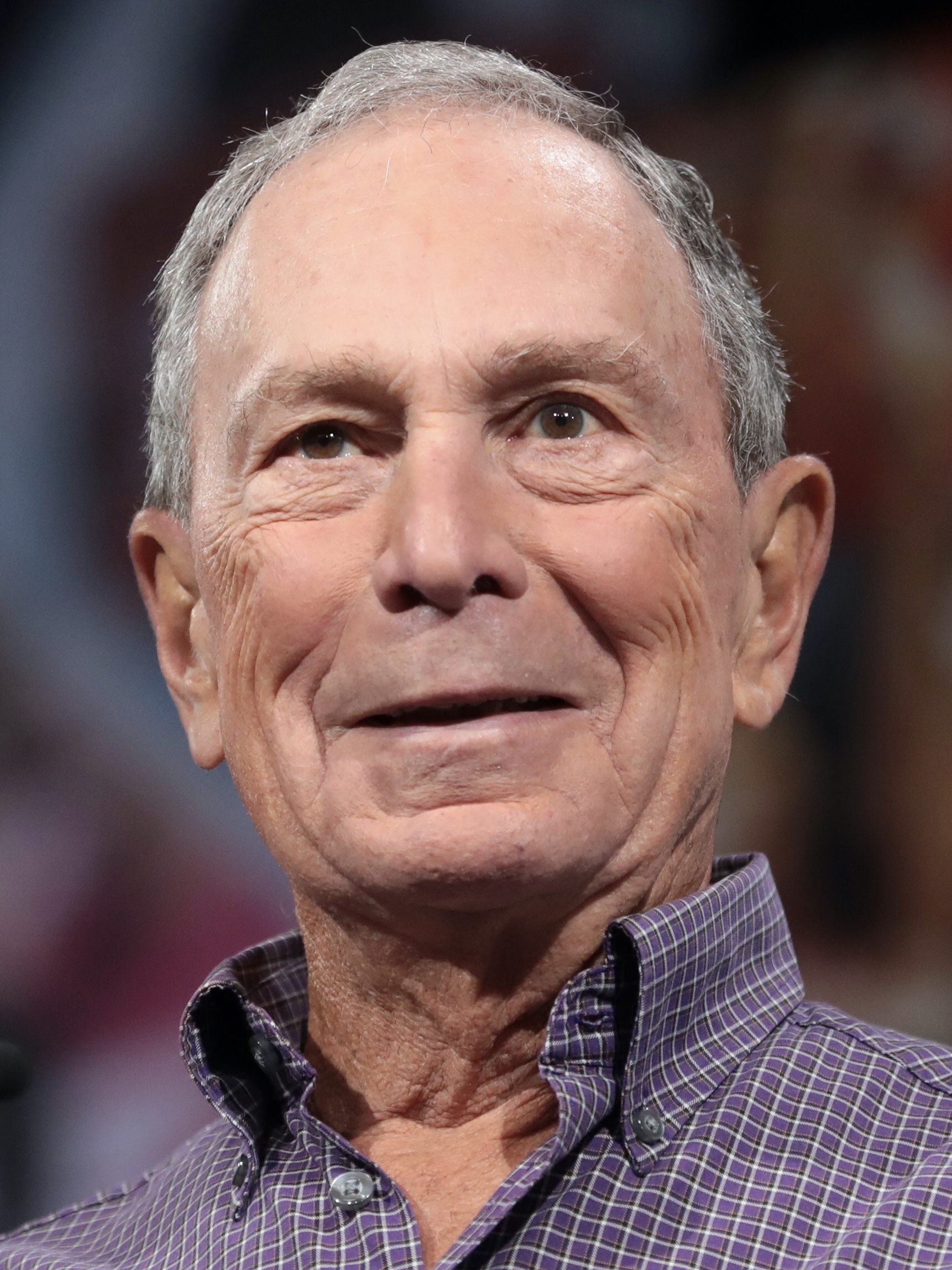

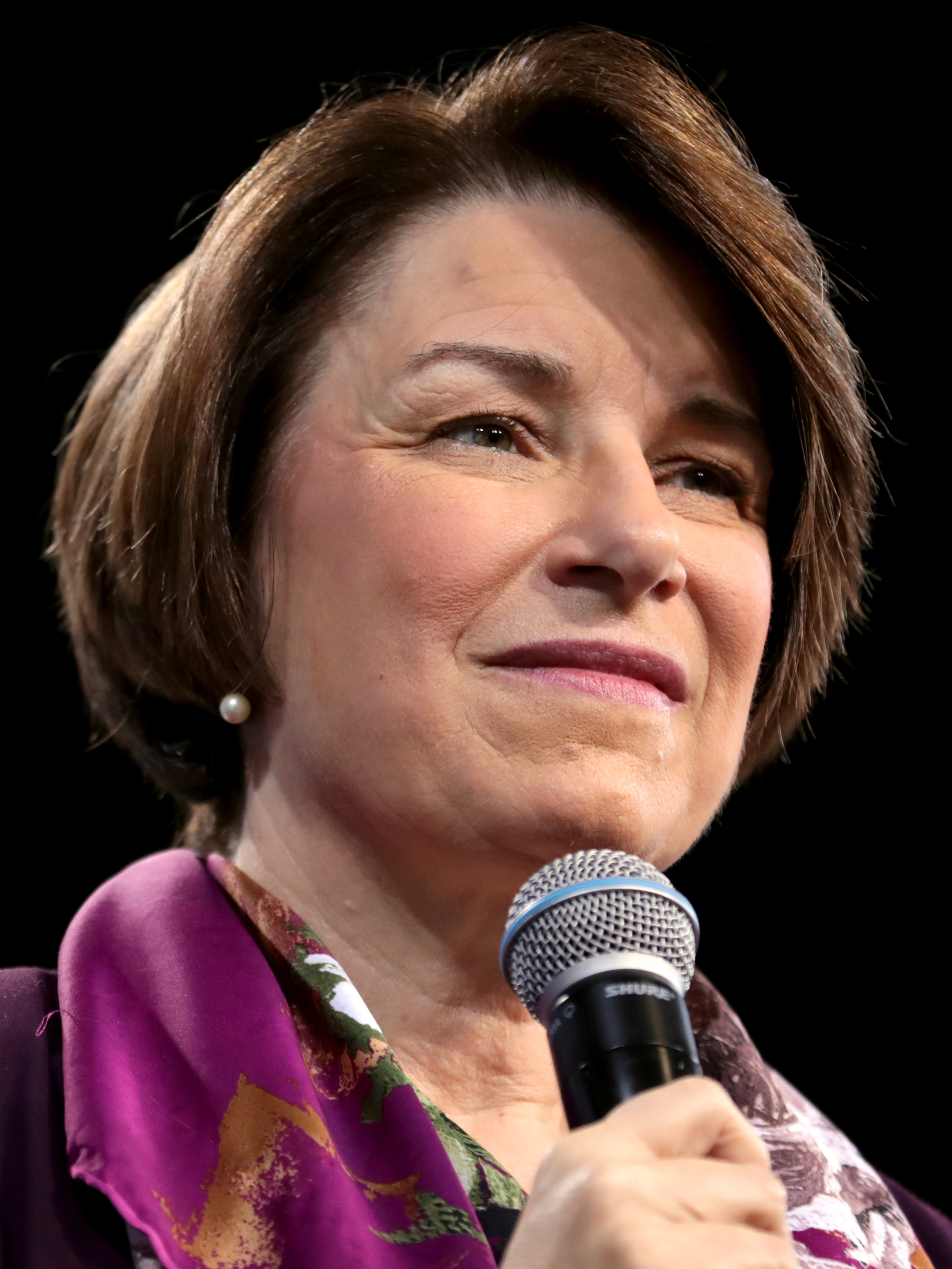
Candidate	Joe Biden	Bernie Sanders	Elizabeth Warren
Home state	Delaware	Vermont	Massachusetts
Delegate count	38	27	10
Popular vote	287,553	222,431	114,674
Percentage	38.64%	29.89%	15.41%
Candidate	Michael Bloomberg	Amy Klobuchar (withdrawn) (Note: Klobuchar withdrew on March 2, 2020, the day before the primary. Absentee voting had already occurred.)
Home state	New York	Minnesota
Delegate count	0	0
Popular vote	61,882	41,530
Percentage	8.32%	5.58%
Biden
30 – 40%
40 – 50%
50 – 60%
60 – 70%
Sanders
<30%
30 – 40%
Klobuchar
<30%
30 – 40%
40 – 50%
Joe Biden
Bernie Sanders
Amy Klobuchar
Joe Biden
Bernie Sanders
Biden
<30%
30–40%
40–50%
50–60%
60–70%
70–80%
80–90%
90-100%
Sanders
<30%
30–40%
40–50%
50–60%
60–70%
70-80%
80-90%
90–100%
Warren
<30%
30–40%
40–50%
50–60%
60–70%
70–80%
80-90%
90–100%
Bloomberg
<30%
30–40%
40–50%
50–60%
60–70%
70-80%
80-90%
90–100%
Klobuchar
<30%
30–40%
40–50%
50–60%
60–70%
70–80%
80–90%
90–100%
Buttigieg
<30%
30–40%
40–50%
50–60%
60–70%
70–80%
80–90%
90–100%
Others
Tie
No Votes Cast

Pledged national convention delegates
Type	Del.
CD1	5
CD2	6
CD3	7
CD4	8
CD5	10
CD6	4
CD7	4
CD8	5
PLEO	10
At-large	16
Total pledged delegates	75

The 2020 Minnesota Democratic presidential primary took place on March 3, 2020, as one of 15 contests scheduled on Super Tuesday in the Democratic Party primaries for the 2020 presidential election, following the South Carolina primary the weekend before. The Minnesota primary, only the fifth in the state's history and the first since 1992, was an open primary, with the state awarding 91 delegates towards the 2020 Democratic National Convention, of which 75 were pledged delegates allocated on the basis of the results of the primary. Early voting was possible for just over six weeks beginning January 17, 2020.

Former vice president Joe Biden had played virtually no role in the polls heading into the primary but benefitted from the withdrawal and endorsement of senator Amy Klobuchar on the previous day, the original front-runner in her home state, and won with almost 39% of the vote, gathering 38 delegates and winning in 76 counties. Senator Bernie Sanders lost many counties he had won in 2016, when he won the state easily by double digit margins against Hillary Clinton, and placed second with around 30% and 27 delegates, his only strongholds having been in college towns, St. Cloud and the Minneapolis and St. Paul city limits. While senator Elizabeth Warren narrowly surpassed the 15% threshold and won 10 delegates, former mayor Michael Bloomberg and Klobuchar, who despite her withdrawal had carried a number of counties due to early voting, placed fourth and fifth without winning delegates.

== Procedure ==
Minnesota was one of 14 states and one territory holding primaries on March 3, 2020, also known as "Super Tuesday". While Party-run caucuses were still held in the state, they no longer included or influenced the presidential nomination question. Then-governor Mark Dayton had signed a bill on May 22, 2016, matching a national trend for the change from a traditional caucus system to presidential nominating contests, marking the first binding Democratic primary in the state since 1956 (as the primary ordered by state law in 1992 had been ignored by the party and was therefore non-binding).

Absentee voting began on January 17, 2020. A legal challenge was brought jointly by James Martin and Rocky De La Fuente threatening to disrupt the process, but was denied by the Minnesota Supreme Court. Voting on Super Tuesday took place from 7:00 a.m. until 8:00 p.m. in much of the state, with voting in certain townships starting at 10:00 a.m. Under Minnesota's open primary law, there were no qualifications that a candidate had to meet in order for that candidate's name to be printed on a primary ballot excepting only being included in the notice provided by the party's chair to the Minnesota Secretary of State; there were no restrictions as to what names the chair was allowed to give in its notice. Under state party rules, however, candidates had to meet a threshold of 15 percent at the congressional district or statewide level in order to be considered viable.

The 75 pledged delegates to the 2020 Democratic National Convention were allocated proportionally on the basis of the results of the primary. Of the 75 pledged delegates, between 4 and 10 were allocated to each of the state's 8 congressional districts and another 10 were allocated to party leaders and elected officials (PLEO delegates), in addition to 16 at-large delegates. The Super Tuesday primary as part of Stage I on the primary timetable received no bonus delegates, in order to disperse the primaries between more different date clusters and keep too many states from hoarding on the first shared date or on a March date in general.

Following so-called "organizing unit conventions" between March 7, 2020, and April 19, 2020, during which delegates for the congressional district and state conventions were nominated, the congressional district conventions took place between May 2, 2020, and May 29, 2020, to select national convention district delegates. The state convention to vote on the 16 at-large and 10 pledged PLEO delegates for the Democratic National Convention was planned to be held virtually on May 31, 2020, but the speaking portion of it (not the online elections) were postponed to a later date due to the protests following the murder of George Floyd. The delegation also included 16 unpledged PLEO delegates: 7 members of the Democratic National Committee, 7 members of Congress (both senators, notably Amy Klobuchar, and 5 representatives), the governor Tim Walz, and former vice president Walter Mondale.

== Candidates ==
15 candidates and an uncommitted option were on the ballot in Minnesota:

Running

- Joe Biden
- Michael Bloomberg
- Tulsi Gabbard
- Bernie Sanders
- Elizabeth Warren

Withdrawn

- Michael Bennet (Note: Candidate withdrew after the New Hampshire primary when absentee voting had already begun.)
- Cory Booker
- Pete Buttigieg (Note: Candidate withdrew shortly before the primary when absentee voting had already begun.)
- Julian Castro
- John Delaney (Note: Candidate withdrew during the first days of absentee voting.)
- Amy Klobuchar
- Deval Patrick
- Tom Steyer
- Marianne Williamson
- Andrew Yang

== Campaign ==
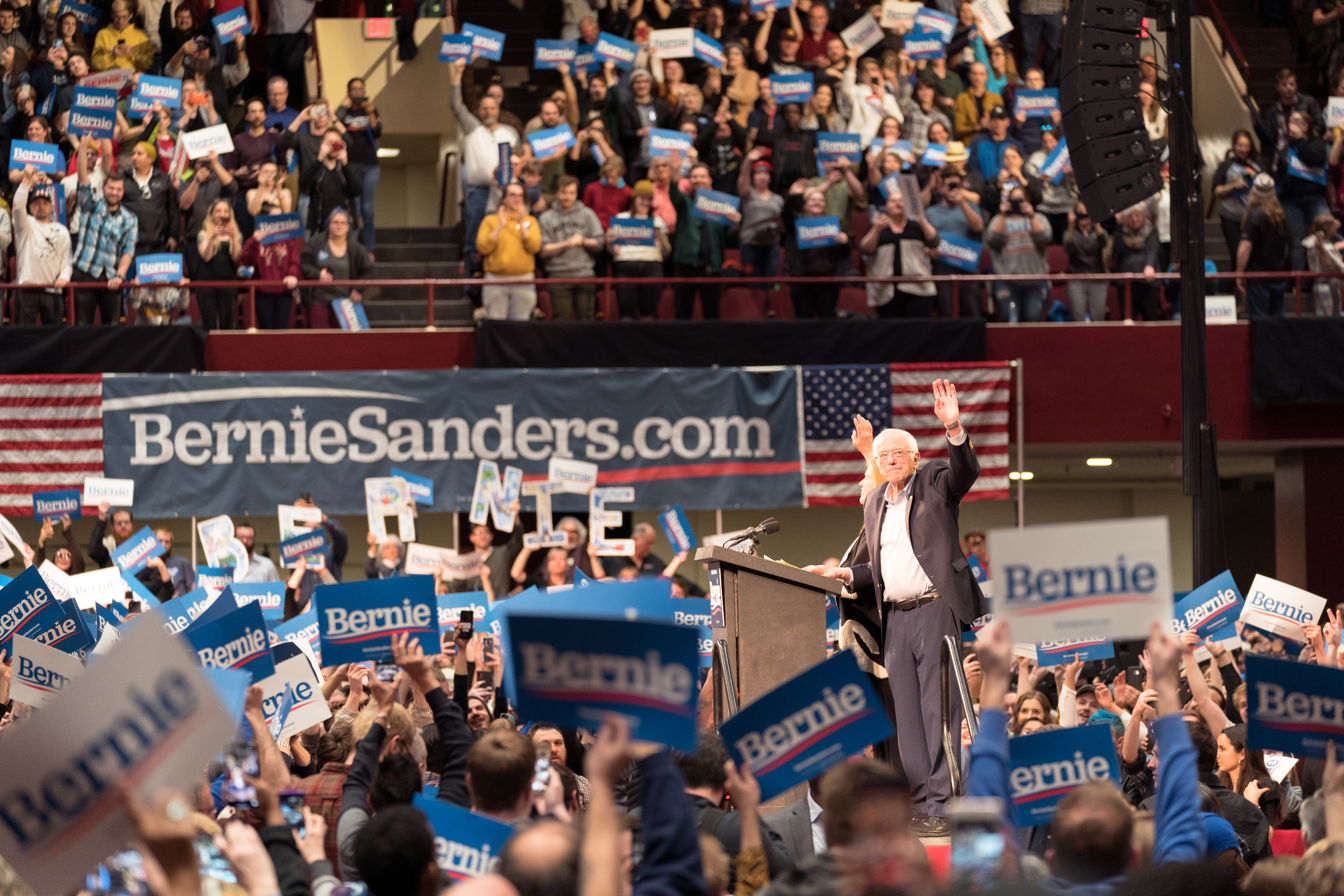
Sanders at a rally in Saint Paul, Minnesota on March 2, 2020

With the impeachment trial coming up and taking up the time of several of the top tier candidates, including Minnesota senator Amy Klobuchar, the start of early voting was extremely important to her and the state party. Several rallies featuring her and other top DFL officials were held on that day, January 17.

Amy Klobuchar suspended her campaign one day before Super Tuesday, after 100,000 voters had already requested early voting ballots. This is likely to have contributed to her receiving 5.6 percent of the vote, and coming in first in several counties.

== Polling ==
Amy Klobuchar led in pre-election polling, but withdrew from the race the night before the election and endorsed Joe Biden (who went on to win Minnesota).

Polling Aggregation
Source of poll aggregation	Date updated	Dates polled	Amy Klobuchar	Bernie Sanders	Elizabeth Warren	Joe Biden	Michael Bloomberg	Tulsi Gabbard	Un- decided (Note: Calculated by taking the difference of 100% and all other candidates combined)
270 to Win	Mar 2, 2020	Feb 20–22, 2020	28.0%	22.0%	13.5%	8.5%	6.0%	2.5%	19.5%
FiveThirtyEight	Mar 2, 2020	until Mar 2, 2020 (Note: FiveThirtyEight aggregates polls with a trendline regression of polls rather than a strict average of recent polls.)	24.4%	26.2%	14.4%	10.7%	5.6%	1.5%	17.2%
Average			26.2%	24.1%	14.0%	9.6%	5.8%	2.0%	18.3%
Minnesota Primary results (March 3, 2020)			5.6%	29.9%	15.4%	38.6%	8.3%	0.3%	1.8%

Tabulation of individual polls of the 2020 Minnesota Democratic Primary
Poll source	Date(s) administered	Sample size (Note: Key: A – all adults RV – registered voters LV – likely voters V – unclear)	Margin of error	Joe Biden	Michael Bloomberg	Pete Buttigieg	Kamala Harris	Amy Klobuchar	Beto O'Rourke	Bernie Sanders	Elizabeth Warren	Other	Undecided
	Mar 2, 2020	Klobuchar withdraws from the race											
Swayable	Mar 1–2, 2020	1,472 (LV)	± 4.0%	20%	14%	4%	–	21%	–	27%	8%	6% (Note: Steyer with 1%; Gabbard with 0%; "Other" with 5%)	–
Data for Progress	Feb 28–Mar 2, 2020	650 (LV)	± 3.84%	27%	16%	–	–	2%	–	32%	21%	1% (Note: Gabbard with 1%)	–
	Mar 1, 2020	Buttigieg withdraws from the race											
Mason-Dixon/Star Tribune/ MPR News Minnesota	Feb 17–20, 2020	500(LV)	± 4.5%	8%	3%	3%	–	29%	–	23%	11%	2% (Note: Gabbard and Steyer with 1%)	21%
University of Massachusetts Lowell	Feb 12–19, 2020	450(LV)	± 6.4%	9%	9%	10%	–	27%	–	21%	16%	4% (Note: Gabbard with 4%; Steyer and "Another Candidate" with 0%)	4%
	Dec 3, 2019	Harris withdraws from the race											
	Nov 1, 2019	O'Rourke withdraws from the race											
St. Cloud State University	Oct 14-Nov 1, 2019	177 (LV)	–	15%	–	2%	–	15%	–	12%	15%	–	–
Kaiser Family Foundation	Sep 23–Oct 15, 2019	249	–	14%	–	7%	1%	15%	1%	13%	25%	5% (Note: Yang with 4%; Booker with 1%; Steyer, Castro, and Refused to answer with 0%; Someone else not reported)	21%
Change Research	Jun 8–12, 2019	772	± 3.7%	20%	–	11%	4%	16%	3%	19%	21%	5% (Note: Yang with 2%; Booker, Castro, and Inslee with 1%; Bennet, Delaney, Gabbard, Gillibrand, Gravel, Messam, Moulton, Ryan, and Williamson with 0%)	–

== Results ==
Popular vote share by county
Biden—30–40%
Biden—40–50%
Biden—50–60%
Biden—60–70%
Sanders—<30%
Sanders—30–40%
Klobuchar—<30%
Klobuchar—30–40%
Klobuchar—40–50%

Popular vote share by congressional district
Biden—30–40%
Biden—40–50%
Sanders—30–40%

2020 Minnesota Democratic presidential primary
Candidate	Votes	%	Delegates
Joe Biden	287,553	38.64	38
Bernie Sanders	222,431	29.89	27
Elizabeth Warren	114,674	15.41	10
Michael Bloomberg	61,882	8.32	
Amy Klobuchar (withdrawn)	41,530	5.58	
Pete Buttigieg (withdrawn)	7,616	1.02	
Tulsi Gabbard	2,504	0.34	
Andrew Yang (withdrawn)	1,749	0.24	
Tom Steyer (withdrawn)	551	0.07	
Michael Bennet (withdrawn)	315	0.04	
Marianne Williamson (withdrawn)	226	0.03	
Cory Booker (withdrawn)	197	0.03	
John Delaney (withdrawn)	172	0.02	
Julian Castro (withdrawn)	114	0.02	
Deval Patrick (withdrawn) (Note: Candidate withdrew after in-person absentee voting started on January 17, 2020.)	72	0.01	
Uncommitted	2,612	0.35	
Total	744,198	100%	75

=== Results by county ===
2020 Minnesota Democratic primary (results per county) (Note: The results are official because they were certified by the State Canvassing Board on March 10, 2020 before being retrieved on April 2, 2020.)
County	Joe Biden		Bernie Sanders		Elizabeth Warren		Michael Bloomberg		Amy Klobuchar		Pete Buttigieg		Tulsi Gabbard		Andrew Yang		Tom Steyer		Michael Bennet		Marianne Williamson		Cory Booker		John Delaney		Julian Castro		Deval Patrick		Uncommitted		Total votes cast
County	Votes	%	Votes	%	Votes	%	Votes	%	Votes	%	Votes	%	Votes	%	Votes	%	Votes	%	Votes	%	Votes	%	Votes	%	Votes	%	Votes	%	Votes	%	Votes	%	Total votes cast
Aitkin	510	32.84	260	16.74	84	5.41	228	14.68	395	25.43	36	2.32	4	0.26	1	0.06	8	0.52	0	0	1	0.06	0	0	2	0.13	0	0	1	0.06	23	1.48	1,553
Anoka	15,176	42.20	11,280	31.37	4,156	11.56	3,303	9.18	1,425	3.96	221	0.61	133	0.37	105	0.29	19	0.05	15	0.04	9	0.03	1	0.00	4	0.01	3	0.01	1	0.00	111	0.31	35,962
Becker	1,120	50.61	440	19.88	188	8.50	187	8.45	211	9.53	26	1.17	11	0.50	5	0.23	4	0.18	0	0	0	0	0	0	2	0.09	1	0.05	0	0	18	0.81	2,213
Beltrami	1,450	32.78	1,720	38.89	407	9.20	362	8.18	357	8.07	58	1.31	23	0.52	6	0.14	5	0.11	5	0.11	1	0.02	0	0	2	0.05	1	0.02	0	0	26	0.59	4,423
Benton	982	40.31	817	33.54	244	10.02	221	9.07	120	4.93	15	0.62	11	0.45	4	0.16	1	0.04	3	0.12	0	0	2	0.08	2	0.08	1	0.04	1	0.04	12	0.49	2,436
Big Stone	123	26.00	56	11.84	29	6.13	58	12.26	175	37.00	17	3.59	3	0.63	1	0.21	3	0.63	0	0	0	0	0	0	0	0	0	0	0	0	8	1.69	473
Blue Earth	2,417	32.61	2,766	37.32	825	11.13	553	7.46	632	8.53	119	1.61	31	0.42	22	0.30	7	0.09	4	0.05	2	0.03	3	0.04	1	0.01	3	0.04	1	0.01	26	0.35	7,412
Brown	650	39.90	336	20.63	148	9.09	218	13.38	215	13.20	32	1.96	6	0.37	0	0	4	0.25	0	0	1	0.06	1	0.06	0	0	1	0.06	0	0	17	1.04	1,629
Carlton	2,056	45.17	1,134	24.91	329	7.23	515	11.31	389	8.55	56	1.23	19	0.42	8	0.18	6	0.13	3	0.07	2	0.04	3	0.07	2	0.04	0	0	1	0.02	29	0.64	4,552
Carver	5,165	48.14	2,417	22.53	1,386	12.92	1,044	9.73	514	4.79	120	1.12	34	0.32	14	0.13	9	0.08	0	0	3	0.03	0	0	0	0	0	0	0	0	23	0.21	10,729
Cass	903	35.76	615	24.36	165	6.53	371	14.69	342	13.54	76	3.01	10	0.40	9	0.36	6	0.24	3	0.12	4	0.16	0	0	1	0.04	2	0.08	0	0	18	0.71	2,525
Chippewa	319	38.57	149	18.02	57	6.89	86	10.40	179	21.64	18	2.18	5	0.60	0	0	1	0.12	0	0	0	0	1	0.12	2	0.24	1	0.12	0	0	9	1.09	827
Chisago	2,030	48.54	973	23.27	436	10.43	474	11.33	182	4.35	32	0.77	19	0.45	7	0.17	2	0.05	2	0.05	3	0.07	0	0	3	0.07	0	0	0	0	19	0.45	4,182
Clay	2,281	39.27	1,768	30.44	761	13.10	360	6.20	499	8.59	59	1.02	22	0.38	7	0.12	4	0.07	1	0.02	2	0.03	2	0.03	2	0.03	0	0	2	0.03	38	0.65	5,808
Clearwater	255	51.00	129	25.80	22	4.40	33	6.60	45	9.00	4	0.80	1	0.20	2	0.40	1	0.20	0	0	0	0	0	0	0	0	0	0	0	0	8	1.60	500
Cook	333	21.43	376	24.20	271	17.44	126	8.11	339	21.81	78	5.02	11	0.71	0	0	3	0.19	0	0	1	0.06	1	0.06	2	0.13	1	0.06	0	0	12	0.77	1,554
Cottonwood	275	51.02	107	19.85	52	9.65	73	13.54	21	3.90	4	0.74	1	0.19	1	0.19	0	0	0	0	0	0	0	0	0	0	0	0	0	0	5	0.93	539
Crow Wing	2,325	45.49	1,139	22.29	438	8.57	576	11.27	476	9.31	89	1.74	17	0.33	9	0.18	3	0.06	4	0.08	3	0.06	0	0	1	0.02	1	0.02	0	0	30	0.59	5,111
Dakota	24,759	43.84	15,479	27.41	7,457	13.20	5,115	9.06	2,622	4.64	519	0.92	182	0.32	106	0.19	24	0.04	13	0.02	17	0.03	14	0.02	7	0.01	12	0.02	2	0.00	147	0.26	56,475
Dodge	685	52.53	301	23.08	128	9.82	109	8.36	59	4.52	7	0.54	5	0.38	3	0.23	2	0.15	0	0	0	0	1	0.08	0	0	0	0	0	0	4	0.31	1,304
Douglas	1,445	52.93	468	17.14	245	8.97	340	12.45	175	6.41	22	0.81	12	0.44	3	0.11	2	0.07	3	0.11	4	0.15	0	0	0	0	1	0.04	0	0	10	0.37	2,730
Faribault	398	47.72	148	17.75	60	7.19	129	15.47	74	8.87	9	1.08	2	0.24	1	0.12	2	0.24	0	0	1	0.12	1	0.12	1	0.12	2	0.24	0	0	6	0.72	834
Fillmore	786	45.67	344	19.99	162	9.41	166	9.65	194	11.27	30	1.74	4	0.23	12	0.70	9	0.52	2	0.12	0	0	1	0.06	1	0.06	0	0	0	0	10	0.58	1,721
Freeborn	1,315	49.79	656	24.84	143	5.41	255	9.66	205	7.76	28	1.06	7	0.27	6	0.23	4	0.15	4	0.15	0	0	1	0.04	1	0.04	0	0	0	0	16	0.61	2,641
Goodhue	2,178	47.94	960	21.13	492	10.83	509	11.20	289	6.36	49	1.08	28	0.62	8	0.18	6	0.13	1	0.02	0	0	1	0.02	1	0.02	1	0.02	0	0	20	0.44	4,543
Grant	115	18.95	80	13.18	28	4.61	89	14.66	236	38.88	29	4.78	6	0.99	5	0.82	0	0	0	0	1	0.16	1	0.16	0	0	0	0	0	0	17	2.80	607
Hennepin	92,107	34.52	88,560	33.19	51,339	19.24	19,072	7.15	10,991	4.12	2,504	0.94	734	0.28	532	0.20	127	0.05	84	0.03	66	0.02	67	0.03	49	0.02	31	0.01	19	0.01	515	0.19	266,797
Houston	964	49.16	506	25.80	196	9.99	189	9.64	74	3.77	6	0.31	8	0.41	0	0	1	0.05	1	0.05	0	0	0	0	1	0.05	0	0	0	0	15	0.76	1,961
Hubbard	788	43.20	421	23.08	149	8.17	209	11.46	196	10.75	28	1.54	5	0.27	3	0.16	8	0.44	1	0.05	0	0	0	0	2	0.11	0	0	0	0	14	0.77	1,824
Isanti	1,217	49.27	595	24.09	195	7.89	292	11.82	124	5.02	12	0.49	15	0.61	6	0.24	1	0.04	1	0.04	0	0	1	0.04	0	0	0	0	0	0	11	0.45	2,470
Itasca	1,988	38.33	1,001	19.30	340	6.55	667	12.86	879	16.95	156	3.01	27	0.52	15	0.29	13	0.25	4	0.08	3	0.06	5	0.10	1	0.02	2	0.04	3	0.06	83	1.60	5,187
Jackson	282	45.71	107	17.34	36	5.83	74	11.99	95	15.40	7	1.13	3	0.49	1	0.16	2	0.32	3	0.49	0	0	0	0	0	0	0	0	0	0	7	1.13	617
Kanabec	513	51.61	228	22.94	82	8.25	106	10.66	40	4.02	10	1.01	3	0.30	2	0.20	0	0	0	0	1	0.10	1	0.10	1	0.10	1	0.10	0	0	6	0.60	994
Kandiyohi	1,496	49.68	589	19.56	236	7.84	371	12.32	238	7.90	31	1.03	8	0.27	12	0.40	3	0.10	3	0.10	3	0.10	3	0.10	1	0.03	1	0.03	0	0	16	0.53	3,011
Kittson	158	31.10	50	9.84	28	5.51	39	7.68	198	38.98	13	2.56	3	0.59	0	0	0	0	3	0.59	0	0	0	0	1	0.20	1	0.20	0	0	14	2.76	508
Koochiching	535	42.80	212	16.96	67	5.36	201	16.08	185	14.80	26	2.08	4	0.32	0	0	4	0.32	1	0.08	1	0.08	0	0	0	0	1	0.08	0	0	13	1.04	1,250
Lac qui Parle	221	35.02	75	11.89	29	4.60	71	11.25	201	31.85	17	2.69	1	0.16	0	0	1	0.16	1	0.16	1	0.16	0	0	0	0	1	0.16	0	0	12	1.90	631
Lake	812	44.18	459	24.97	184	10.01	211	11.48	122	6.64	21	1.14	3	0.16	4	0.22	7	0.38	1	0.05	0	0	0	0	1	0.05	0	0	0	0	13	0.71	1,838
Lake of the Woods	99	28.53	42	12.10	9	2.59	36	10.37	115	33.14	28	8.07	3	0.86	1	0.29	2	0.58	0	0	2	0.58	1	0.29	0	0	0	0	0	0	9	2.59	347
Le Sueur	735	37.50	345	17.60	142	7.24	255	13.01	402	20.51	35	1.79	13	0.66	4	0.20	1	0.05	2	0.10	2	0.10	0	0	1	0.05	1	0.05	0	0	22	1.12	1,960
Lincoln	209	65.31	47	14.69	15	4.69	24	7.50	17	5.31	1	0.31	3	0.94	2	0.63	1	0.31	0	0	0	0	0	0	0	0	0	0	0	0	1	0.31	320
Lyon	616	39.04	388	24.59	150	9.51	162	10.27	199	12.61	28	1.77	7	0.44	5	0.32	3	0.19	1	0.06	1	0.06	0	0	1	0.06	0	0	0	0	17	1.08	1,578
Mahnomen	864	46.15	482	25.75	156	8.33	237	12.66	95	5.07	13	0.69	9	0.48	8	0.43	1	0.05	0	0	0	0	1	0.05	1	0.05	0	0	0	0	5	0.27	1,872
Marshall	105	23.65	124	27.93	11	2.48	53	11.94	125	28.15	8	1.80	3	0.68	0	0	2	0.45	2	0.45	0	0	0	0	0	0	0	0	1	0.23	10	2.25	444
Martin	166	27.39	74	12.21	24	3.96	69	11.39	206	33.99	40	6.60	3	0.50	4	0.66	3	0.50	1	0.17	0	0	1	0.17	0	0	0	0	0	0	15	2.48	606
McLeod	450	50.00	177	19.67	95	10.56	104	11.56	50	5.56	7	0.78	2	0.22	2	0.22	1	0.11	1	0.11	0	0	1	0.11	0	0	0	0	0	0	10	1.11	900
Meeker	536	42.01	221	17.32	90	7.05	164	12.85	211	16.54	31	2.43	4	0.31	5	0.39	0	0	2	0.16	1	0.08	2	0.16	0	0	0	0	0	0	9	0.71	1,276
Mille Lacs	653	44.06	413	27.87	110	7.42	196	13.23	91	6.14	13	0.88	3	0.20	0	0	1	0.07	0	0	0	0	0	0	0	0	0	0	0	0	2	0.13	1,482
Morrison	706	43.18	318	19.45	109	6.67	204	12.48	221	13.52	26	1.59	11	0.67	6	0.37	3	0.18	1	0.06	4	0.24	0	0	1	0.06	0	0	1	0.06	24	1.47	1,635
Mower	1,499	45.00	781	23.45	200	6.00	370	11.11	317	9.52	75	2.25	15	0.45	28	0.84	13	0.39	4	0.12	2	0.06	0	0	2	0.06	2	0.06	0	0	23	0.69	3,331
Murray	270	44.63	89	14.71	31	5.12	58	9.59	115	19.01	21	3.47	2	0.33	0	0	2	0.33	0	0	1	0.17	0	0	2	0.33	0	0	0	0	14	2.31	605
Nicollet	1,554	35.86	1,331	30.72	638	14.72	387	8.93	322	7.43	55	1.27	11	0.25	9	0.21	6	0.14	1	0.02	1	0.02	1	0.02	1	0.02	1	0.02	0	0	15	0.35	4,333
Nobles	344	37.19	253	27.35	51	5.51	107	11.57	117	12.65	23	2.49	6	0.65	0	0	2	0.22	0	0	3	0.32	1	0.11	2	0.22	0	0	0	0	16	1.73	925
Norman	183	30.20	102	16.83	42	6.93	59	9.74	171	28.22	30	4.95	2	0.33	3	0.50	3	0.50	0	0	0	0	0	0	1	0.17	0	0	0	0	10	1.65	606
Olmsted	8,524	42.76	5,462	27.40	2,748	13.78	1,382	6.93	1,331	6.68	236	1.18	73	0.37	53	0.27	12	0.06	7	0.04	4	0.02	5	0.03	5	0.03	3	0.02	3	0.02	87	0.44	19,935
Otter Tail	2,166	52.03	800	19.22	404	9.70	388	9.32	284	6.82	33	0.79	31	0.74	15	0.36	3	0.07	1	0.02	0	0	3	0.07	3	0.07	1	0.02	0	0	31	0.74	4,163
Pennington	364	47.21	193	25.03	47	6.10	47	6.10	89	11.54	12	1.56	4	0.52	7	0.91	1	0.13	0	0	0	0	0	0	0	0	0	0	0	0	7	0.91	771
Pine	915	43.14	474	22.35	175	8.25	282	13.30	200	9.43	33	1.56	10	0.47	2	0.09	2	0.09	2	0.09	1	0.05	0	0	0	0	1	0.05	0	0	24	1.13	2,121
Pipestone	207	42.77	82	16.94	26	5.37	55	11.36	85	17.56	11	2.27	5	1.03	1	0.21	4	0.83	1	0.21	0	0	0	0	0	0	0	0	0	0	7	1.45	484
Polk	796	38.44	400	19.31	144	6.95	171	8.26	422	20.38	64	3.09	11	0.53	10	0.48	7	0.34	2	0.10	3	0.14	2	0.10	0	0	1	0.05	2	0.10	36	1.74	2,071
Pope	430	49.09	130	14.84	47	5.37	109	12.44	137	15.64	8	0.91	5	0.57	1	0.11	2	0.23	1	0.11	0	0	0	0	0	0	0	0	1	0.11	5	0.57	876
Ramsey	34,706	33.13	34,498	32.93	21,971	20.97	6,928	6.61	4,631	4.42	905	0.86	303	0.29	366	0.35	55	0.05	41	0.04	29	0.03	33	0.03	31	0.03	12	0.01	13	0.01	239	0.23	104,761
Red Lake	70	25.64	35	12.82	16	5.86	15	5.49	113	41.39	12	4.40	2	0.73	0	0	0	0	0	0	0	0	0	0	0	0	0	0	0	0	10	3.66	273
Redwood	344	50.89	163	24.11	55	8.14	55	8.14	36	5.33	5	0.74	5	0.74	5	0.74	2	0.30	1	0.15	1	0.15	0	0	1	0.15	0	0	0	0	3	0.44	676
Renville	370	49.60	156	20.91	52	6.97	104	13.94	51	6.84	4	0.54	3	0.40	1	0.13	0	0	3	0.40	0	0	0	0	0	0	1	0.13	0	0	1	0.13	746
Rice	3,212	37.02	2,853	32.88	1,484	17.10	571	6.58	395	4.55	73	0.84	36	0.41	11	0.13	4	0.05	5	0.06	3	0.03	2	0.02	3	0.03	1	0.01	1	0.01	22	0.25	8,676
Rock	223	38.65	102	17.68	40	6.93	42	7.28	134	23.22	22	3.81	6	1.04	0	0	3	0.52	0	0	0	0	1	0.17	0	0	1	0.17	0	0	3	0.52	577
Roseau	270	37.71	105	14.66	47	6.56	80	11.17	142	19.83	23	3.21	11	1.54	6	0.84	0	0	1	0.14	1	0.14	0	0	0	0	0	0	0	0	30	4.19	716
Saint Louis	14,115	42.38	10,054	30.18	3,682	11.05	3,228	9.69	1,528	4.59	233	0.70	137	0.41	63	0.19	35	0.11	16	0.05	10	0.03	6	0.02	4	0.01	5	0.02	7	0.02	185	0.56	33,308
Scott	5,820	45.05	3,544	27.43	1,493	11.56	1,204	9.32	590	4.57	121	0.94	59	0.46	25	0.19	9	0.07	2	0.02	2	0.02	1	0.01	4	0.03	1	0.01	1	0.01	44	0.34	12,920
Sherburne	2,794	46.23	1,640	27.13	583	9.65	625	10.34	280	4.63	47	0.78	28	0.46	5	0.08	4	0.07	9	0.15	2	0.03	0	0	1	0.02	0	0	3	0.05	23	0.38	6,044
Sibley	328	41.31	135	17.00	59	7.43	119	14.99	115	14.48	19	2.39	6	0.76	1	0.13	2	0.25	1	0.13	0	0	0	0	1	0.13	0	0	0	0	8	1.01	794
Stearns	4,204	38.60	3,355	30.81	1,271	11.67	998	9.16	773	7.10	134	1.23	44	0.40	26	0.24	12	0.11	7	0.06	5	0.05	4	0.04	3	0.03	4	0.04	1	0.01	50	0.46	10,891
Steele	1,142	43.89	671	25.79	257	9.88	310	11.91	156	6.00	21	0.81	13	0.50	6	0.23	2	0.08	3	0.12	0	0	4	0.15	3	0.12	1	0.04	0	0	13	0.50	2,602
Stevens	227	22.10	370	36.03	151	14.70	69	6.72	171	16.65	18	1.75	5	0.49	1	0.10	5	0.49	1	0.10	2	0.19	0	0	0	0	0	0	1	0.10	6	0.58	1,027
Swift	291	37.31	114	14.62	47	6.03	112	14.36	192	24.62	9	1.15	2	0.26	2	0.26	0	0	0	0	0	0	1	0.13	0	0	0	0	0	0	10	1.28	780
Todd	605	53.30	239	21.06	92	8.11	116	10.22	59	5.20	3	0.26	3	0.26	1	0.09	0	0	0	0	1	0.09	1	0.09	0	0	0	0	2	0.18	13	1.15	1,135
Traverse	110	39.71	38	13.72	8	2.89	31	11.19	78	28.16	10	3.61	0	0	1	0.36	0	0	0	0	0	0	0	0	0	0	0	0	0	0	1	0.36	277
Wabasha	841	49.24	350	20.49	146	8.55	207	12.12	124	7.26	19	1.11	7	0.41	4	0.23	3	0.18	1	0.06	1	0.06	1	0.06	0	0	0	0	0	0	4	0.23	1,708
Wadena	336	48.28	175	25.14	51	7.33	69	9.91	46	6.61	9	1.29	3	0.43	1	0.14	2	0.29	0	0	0	0	0	0	0	0	0	0	1	0.14	3	0.43	696
Waseca	616	51.59	282	23.62	106	8.88	115	9.63	52	4.36	5	0.42	6	0.50	1	0.08	2	0.17	3	0.25	1	0.08	0	0	0	0	0	0	0	0	5	0.42	1,194
Washington	16,244	46.18	8,827	25.09	4,241	12.06	3,297	9.37	1,874	5.33	355	1.01	103	0.29	98	0.28	20	0.06	17	0.05	7	0.02	10	0.03	5	0.01	6	0.02	1	0.00	71	0.20	35,176
Watonwan	251	32.43	141	18.22	58	7.49	114	14.73	170	21.96	20	2.58	2	0.26	2	0.26	2	0.26	3	0.39	0	0	1	0.13	0	0	1	0.13	0	0	9	1.16	774
Wilkin	130	32.18	55	13.61	21	5.20	45	11.14	127	31.44	14	3.47	2	0.50	0	0	0	0	0	0	0	0	0	0	0	0	0	0	1	0.25	9	2.23	404
Winona	2,221	38.77	1,916	33.44	773	13.49	523	9.13	186	3.25	34	0.59	24	0.42	13	0.23	2	0.03	1	0.02	4	0.07	2	0.03	0	0	1	0.02	1	0.02	28	0.49	5,729
Wright	4,294	49.12	2,053	23.49	880	10.07	933	10.67	395	4.52	77	0.88	36	0.41	22	0.25	7	0.08	5	0.06	2	0.02	1	0.01	2	0.02	1	0.01	0	0	33	0.38	8,741
Yellow Medicine	266	47.42	111	19.79	32	5.70	51	9.09	77	13.73	9	1.60	1	0.18	2	0.36	3	0.53	0	0	0	0	0	0	0	0	0	0	0	0	9	1.60	561
Total	287,553	38.64	222,431	29.89	114,674	15.41	61,882	8.32	41,530	5.58	7,616	1.02	2,504	0.34	1,749	0.24	551	0.07	315	0.04	226	0.03	197	0.03	172	0.02	114	0.02	72	0.01	2,612	0.35	744,198

== Exit polling ==
=== Gender ===
Joe Biden and Bernie Sanders had a fairly even split among male voters (39 and 37 percent respectively), but Biden had a clear lead among female voters (41%). Elizabeth Warren performed notably better among women than men.

=== Race ===
CNN's exit poll was 85% white and 15% non-white. Among white voters, 42% supported Biden, 27% supported Warren, and 17% supported Sanders. Black voters were split between Biden (47%) and Sanders (43%).

=== Age ===
Young voters (17–29) overwhelmingly supported Sanders. Biden dominated the older age groups (45 and older), particularly those 65 and older. Warren and Sanders had more balanced support across the 30-44 age group.

=== Education ===
Joe Biden's support was notable across all education levels, but it was particularly strong among voters who had never attended college, where he received 54% of the vote, and among voters with advanced degrees (44%). In contrast, Bernie Sanders resonated more with voters who had some college education or an associate degree, securing 42% and 33% in these groups, respectively. Elizabeth Warren found significant support among voters with advanced degrees, capturing 23% of their votes.

=== Ideology ===
Among the 1,765 respondents, 24% were very liberal, 42% somewhat liberal, 29% moderate, and 5% conservative. Bernie Sanders was the dominant choice among very liberal voters, capturing 51% of their support. Joe Biden, conversely, was particularly strong with moderate voters, receiving 60% of their votes. Elizabeth Warren found her strongest support among very liberal voters (26%), but like Sanders, her appeal decreased among somewhat liberal and moderate voters (18% and 6%, respectively).

== See also ==
- 2020 Minnesota Republican presidential primary
- Spoiler effect
- Split vote
