= 1956 United States presidential election in Minnesota =

- November 6, 1956
- Turnout: 83.15% ▲

Nominee	Dwight D. Eisenhower	Adlai Stevenson
Party	Republican	Democratic (DFL)
Home state	Pennsylvania (Note: Although he was born in Texas and grew up in Kansas before his military career, at the time of his election Eisenhower was president of Columbia University and was, officially, a resident of New York. During his first term as president, he moved his private residence to Gettysburg, Pennsylvania, and officially changed his residency to Pennsylvania.)	Illinois
Running mate	Richard Nixon	Estes Kefauver
Electoral vote	11	0
Popular vote	719,302	617,525
Percentage	53.68%	46.08%
County results
Eisenhower
50–60%
60–70%
70–80%
Stevenson
40–50%
50–60%
60–70%
President before election
Dwight D. Eisenhower
Republican
Elected President
Dwight D. Eisenhower
Republican

The 1956 United States presidential election in Minnesota took place on November 6, 1956, as part of the 1956 United States presidential election. Voters chose 11 electors, or representatives to the Electoral College, who voted for president and vice president.

Minnesota was won by the Republican Party candidate, incumbent President Dwight D. Eisenhower won the state over former Illinois governor Adlai Stevenson by a margin of 101,777 votes, or 7.6%, which made Minnesota 8% more Democratic than the nation-at-large. Eisenhower went on to win the election nationally, with 457 electoral votes and a landslide 15.4% lead over Stevenson in the popular vote. The 1956 presidential election was a rematch of the 1952 election, in which Eisenhower also defeated Stevenson, both nationally and in Minnesota. Eisenhower is also the last Republican to carry the state twice.

The Democratic nomination campaign leading into 1956 presidential election may have had a major role in the end of the political career of Coya Knutson, the first woman to be elected to the United States House of Representatives from Minnesota. The Minnesota Democratic-Farmer-Labor Party, in a ploy to win a possible vice presidential nomination for its rising star, U.S. Senator Hubert Humphrey, desperately attempted to ensure that Stevenson would win in the DFL Presidential Primary in Minnesota that year. However, Congresswoman Knutson, believing that the agricultural policy positions of U.S. Senator Estes Kefauver of Tennessee would have been more beneficial to her constituents, instead endorsed and campaigned on behalf of Kefauver. In part due to Knutson's efforts, Kefauver won the March 20th Minnesota Presidential Primary; as a result, when Stevenson was ultimately nominated, Kefauver was chosen as his running mate.

Two years later, shortly before the 1958 DFL state convention, a letter signed but not written by Knutson's husband was circulated to reporters. The contents of the letter played on anxieties over deviations from the rigid gender roles of the time, and its publication by newspapers essentially ensured Knutson's defeat in her bid for re-election that year. It has been alleged by several individuals, including Concordia College political science professor Harding Noblitt, Knutson biographer Gretchen Beito, and numerous people who were close to Knutson, that either DFL state leadership or local operatives wrote the letter and bribed Knutson's husband to sign it, as a means to exact retribution against the Congresswoman for denying Humphrey a shot at the vice presidential nomination in 1956.

This was the last time Minnesota voted for a Republican presidential candidate until Eisenhower's vice president, Richard Nixon, won the state in his re-election bid in 1972, after which it has always voted Democratic. After 1956, no Republican presidential nominee would get over 70% of the vote in any Minnesota county again until Donald Trump in 2016.

== Results ==
1956 United States presidential election in Minnesota
Party	Candidate	Votes	Percentage	Electoral votes
Republican	Dwight D. Eisenhower (incumbent)	719,302	53.68%	11
Democratic (DFL)	Adlai Stevenson	617,525	46.08%	0
Industrial Government	Eric Hass	2,080	0.16%	0
Socialist Workers	Farrell Dobbs	1,098	0.08%	0
Totals		1,340,005	100.00%	11
Voter turnout		83%		—

=== Results by county ===
County	Dwight D. Eisenhower Republican		Adlai Stevenson DFL		Eric Hass Industrial Government		Farrell Dobbs Socialist Workers		Margin		Total votes cast
County	#	%	#	%	#	%	#	%	#	%	Total votes cast
Aitkin	2,762	50.18%	2,733	49.65%	3	0.05%	6	0.11%	29	0.53%	5,504
Anoka	9,359	44.37%	11,697	55.46%	23	0.11%	13	0.06%	-2,338	-11.09%	21,092
Becker	4,608	49.81%	4,619	49.93%	15	0.16%	9	0.10%	-11	-0.12%	9,251
Beltrami	3,974	50.97%	3,807	48.83%	2	0.03%	14	0.18%	167	2.14%	7,797
Benton	3,591	57.77%	2,609	41.97%	8	0.13%	8	0.13%	982	15.80%	6,216
Big Stone	1,737	44.25%	2,180	55.54%	5	0.13%	3	0.08%	-443	-11.29%	3,925
Blue Earth	11,398	67.50%	5,467	32.38%	14	0.08%	7	0.04%	5,931	35.12%	16,886
Brown	7,965	72.02%	3,067	27.73%	11	0.10%	16	0.14%	4,898	44.29%	11,059
Carlton	4,168	39.04%	6,484	60.73%	16	0.15%	9	0.08%	-2,316	-21.69%	10,677
Carver	6,226	72.49%	2,334	27.17%	14	0.16%	15	0.17%	3,892	45.32%	8,589
Cass	4,007	59.23%	2,748	40.62%	4	0.06%	6	0.09%	1,259	18.61%	6,765
Chippewa	3,623	51.32%	3,434	48.64%	3	0.04%	0	0.00%	189	2.68%	7,060
Chisago	3,413	55.47%	2,731	44.38%	4	0.07%	5	0.08%	682	11.09%	6,153
Clay	6,783	52.77%	6,057	47.12%	8	0.06%	7	0.05%	726	5.65%	12,855
Clearwater	1,464	40.11%	2,171	59.48%	6	0.16%	9	0.25%	-707	-19.37%	3,650
Cook	1,078	61.67%	668	38.22%	1	0.06%	1	0.06%	410	23.45%	1,748
Cottonwood	4,619	66.29%	2,344	33.64%	4	0.06%	1	0.01%	2,275	32.65%	6,968
Crow Wing	6,657	54.37%	5,556	45.38%	15	0.12%	15	0.12%	1,101	8.99%	12,243
Dakota	13,112	50.74%	12,672	49.04%	35	0.14%	20	0.08%	440	1.70%	25,839
Dodge	3,205	63.78%	1,814	36.10%	4	0.08%	2	0.04%	1,391	27.68%	5,025
Douglas	5,114	54.87%	4,194	45.00%	7	0.08%	5	0.05%	920	9.87%	9,320
Faribault	6,886	65.80%	3,554	33.96%	22	0.21%	3	0.03%	3,332	31.84%	10,465
Fillmore	7,004	67.09%	3,427	32.83%	5	0.05%	4	0.04%	3,577	34.26%	10,440
Freeborn	7,632	51.63%	7,138	48.29%	7	0.05%	4	0.03%	494	3.34%	14,781
Goodhue	9,365	65.25%	4,969	34.62%	12	0.08%	7	0.05%	4,396	30.63%	14,353
Grant	2,064	49.41%	2,107	50.44%	5	0.12%	1	0.02%	-43	-1.03%	4,177
Hennepin	183,248	55.01%	149,341	44.83%	266	0.08%	257	0.08%	33,907	10.18%	333,112
Houston	4,538	67.93%	2,133	31.93%	6	0.09%	3	0.04%	2,405	36.00%	6,680
Hubbard	2,453	62.69%	1,454	37.16%	2	0.05%	4	0.10%	999	25.53%	3,913
Isanti	2,348	47.35%	2,605	52.53%	2	0.04%	4	0.08%	-257	-5.18%	4,959
Itasca	6,408	42.22%	8,737	57.56%	12	0.08%	21	0.14%	-2,329	-15.34%	15,178
Jackson	3,543	52.23%	3,232	47.64%	7	0.10%	2	0.03%	311	4.59%	6,784
Kanabec	1,950	52.80%	1,736	47.01%	3	0.08%	4	0.11%	214	5.79%	3,693
Kandiyohi	5,445	44.25%	6,834	55.54%	14	0.11%	12	0.10%	-1,389	-11.29%	12,305
Kittson	1,569	41.31%	2,222	58.50%	3	0.08%	4	0.11%	-653	-17.19%	3,798
Koochiching	2,757	42.65%	3,695	57.15%	6	0.09%	7	0.11%	-938	-14.50%	6,465
Lac qui Parle	3,276	53.63%	2,826	46.27%	4	0.07%	2	0.03%	450	7.36%	6,108
Lake	2,055	39.96%	3,079	59.87%	6	0.12%	3	0.06%	-1,024	-19.91%	5,143
Lake of the Woods	723	40.69%	1,048	58.98%	3	0.17%	3	0.17%	-325	-18.29%	1,777
Le Sueur	5,026	58.45%	3,556	41.35%	11	0.13%	6	0.07%	1,470	17.10%	8,599
Lincoln	2,060	46.92%	2,316	52.76%	10	0.23%	4	0.09%	-256	-5.84%	4,390
Lyon	5,188	55.27%	4,190	44.64%	2	0.02%	6	0.06%	998	10.63%	9,386
Mahnomen	875	36.58%	1,513	63.25%	2	0.08%	2	0.08%	-638	-26.67%	2,392
Marshall	2,519	41.93%	3,478	57.90%	8	0.13%	2	0.03%	-959	-15.97%	6,007
Martin	8,152	71.16%	3,289	28.71%	9	0.08%	6	0.05%	4,863	42.45%	11,456
McLeod	6,743	68.61%	3,068	31.22%	13	0.13%	4	0.04%	3,675	37.39%	9,828
Meeker	4,738	58.52%	3,348	41.35%	7	0.09%	4	0.05%	1,390	17.17%	8,097
Mille Lacs	3,315	55.80%	2,619	44.08%	3	0.05%	4	0.07%	696	11.72%	5,941
Morrison	5,042	51.84%	4,653	47.84%	17	0.17%	15	0.15%	389	4.00%	9,727
Mower	9,570	50.66%	9,219	48.80%	87	0.46%	14	0.07%	351	1.86%	18,890
Murray	3,261	54.61%	2,695	45.13%	6	0.10%	9	0.15%	566	9.48%	5,971
Nicollet	5,322	66.81%	2,636	33.09%	4	0.05%	4	0.05%	2,686	33.72%	7,966
Nobles	5,196	56.23%	4,036	43.67%	7	0.08%	2	0.02%	1,160	12.56%	9,241
Norman	2,338	46.01%	2,740	53.93%	2	0.04%	1	0.02%	-402	-7.92%	5,081
Olmsted	13,789	65.62%	7,172	34.13%	38	0.18%	13	0.06%	6,617	31.49%	21,012
Otter Tail	12,764	65.88%	6,571	33.91%	21	0.11%	19	0.10%	6,193	31.97%	19,375
Pennington	2,408	44.93%	2,947	54.99%	2	0.04%	2	0.04%	-539	-10.06%	5,359
Pine	3,204	45.50%	3,829	54.38%	4	0.06%	4	0.06%	-625	-8.88%	7,041
Pipestone	3,362	60.76%	2,165	39.13%	3	0.05%	3	0.05%	1,197	21.63%	5,533
Polk	6,847	46.10%	7,980	53.73%	14	0.09%	12	0.08%	-1,133	-7.63%	14,853
Pope	2,725	51.33%	2,577	48.54%	6	0.11%	1	0.02%	148	2.79%	5,309
Ramsey	80,701	47.74%	87,784	51.93%	377	0.22%	177	0.10%	-7,083	-4.19%	169,039
Red Lake	782	33.35%	1,555	66.31%	7	0.30%	1	0.04%	-773	-32.96%	2,345
Redwood	5,956	66.13%	3,039	33.74%	5	0.06%	6	0.07%	2,917	32.39%	9,006
Renville	5,728	57.52%	4,213	42.31%	7	0.07%	10	0.10%	1,515	15.21%	9,958
Rice	8,471	65.24%	4,489	34.57%	14	0.11%	10	0.08%	3,982	30.67%	12,984
Rock	3,267	67.19%	1,591	32.72%	2	0.04%	2	0.04%	1,676	34.47%	4,862
Roseau	1,901	38.23%	3,062	61.57%	1	0.02%	9	0.18%	-1,161	-23.34%	4,973
St. Louis	39,902	38.84%	62,190	60.54%	529	0.51%	102	0.10%	-22,288	-21.70%	102,723
Scott	4,148	54.59%	3,431	45.16%	11	0.14%	8	0.11%	717	9.43%	7,598
Sherburne	2,681	59.75%	1,796	40.03%	7	0.16%	3	0.07%	885	19.72%	4,487
Sibley	4,737	69.23%	2,099	30.68%	3	0.04%	3	0.04%	2,638	38.55%	6,842
Stearns	17,364	63.70%	9,829	36.06%	36	0.13%	28	0.10%	7,535	27.64%	27,257
Steele	6,435	65.91%	3,293	33.73%	30	0.31%	6	0.06%	3,142	32.18%	9,764
Stevens	2,606	58.83%	1,822	41.13%	2	0.05%	0	0.00%	784	17.70%	4,430
Swift	2,637	41.43%	3,720	58.44%	6	0.09%	2	0.03%	-1,083	-17.01%	6,365
Todd	5,075	56.51%	3,882	43.22%	16	0.18%	8	0.09%	1,193	13.29%	8,981
Traverse	1,467	45.87%	1,724	53.91%	4	0.13%	3	0.09%	-257	-8.04%	3,198
Wabasha	4,728	66.89%	2,301	32.56%	32	0.45%	7	0.10%	2,427	34.33%	7,068
Wadena	3,028	63.52%	1,733	36.35%	3	0.06%	3	0.06%	1,295	27.17%	4,767
Waseca	4,663	67.69%	2,215	32.15%	9	0.13%	2	0.03%	2,448	35.54%	6,889
Washington	9,562	56.06%	7,462	43.75%	21	0.12%	11	0.06%	2,100	12.31%	17,056
Watonwan	3,963	67.62%	1,886	32.18%	8	0.14%	4	0.07%	2,077	35.44%	5,861
Wilkin	2,335	55.36%	1,881	44.59%	2	0.05%	0	0.00%	454	10.77%	4,218
Winona	9,743	61.30%	6,048	38.05%	70	0.44%	32	0.20%	3,695	23.25%	15,893
Wright	7,257	59.42%	4,944	40.48%	5	0.04%	7	0.06%	2,313	18.94%	12,213
Yellow Medicine	3,594	51.21%	3,416	48.67%	7	0.10%	1	0.01%	178	2.54%	7,018
Totals	719,302	53.68%	617,525	46.08%	2,080	0.16%	1,098	0.08%	101,777	7.60%	1,340,005

==== Counties that flipped from Republican to Democratic ====
- Becker
- Big Stone
- Grant
- Isanti
- Kandiyohi
- Lincoln
- Marshall
- Norman
- Pine
- Polk
- Swift
- Traverse

==== Counties that flipped from Democratic to Republican ====
- Dakota

== See also ==
- United States presidential elections in Minnesota
