= 1916 United States presidential election in Minnesota =

- November 7, 1916
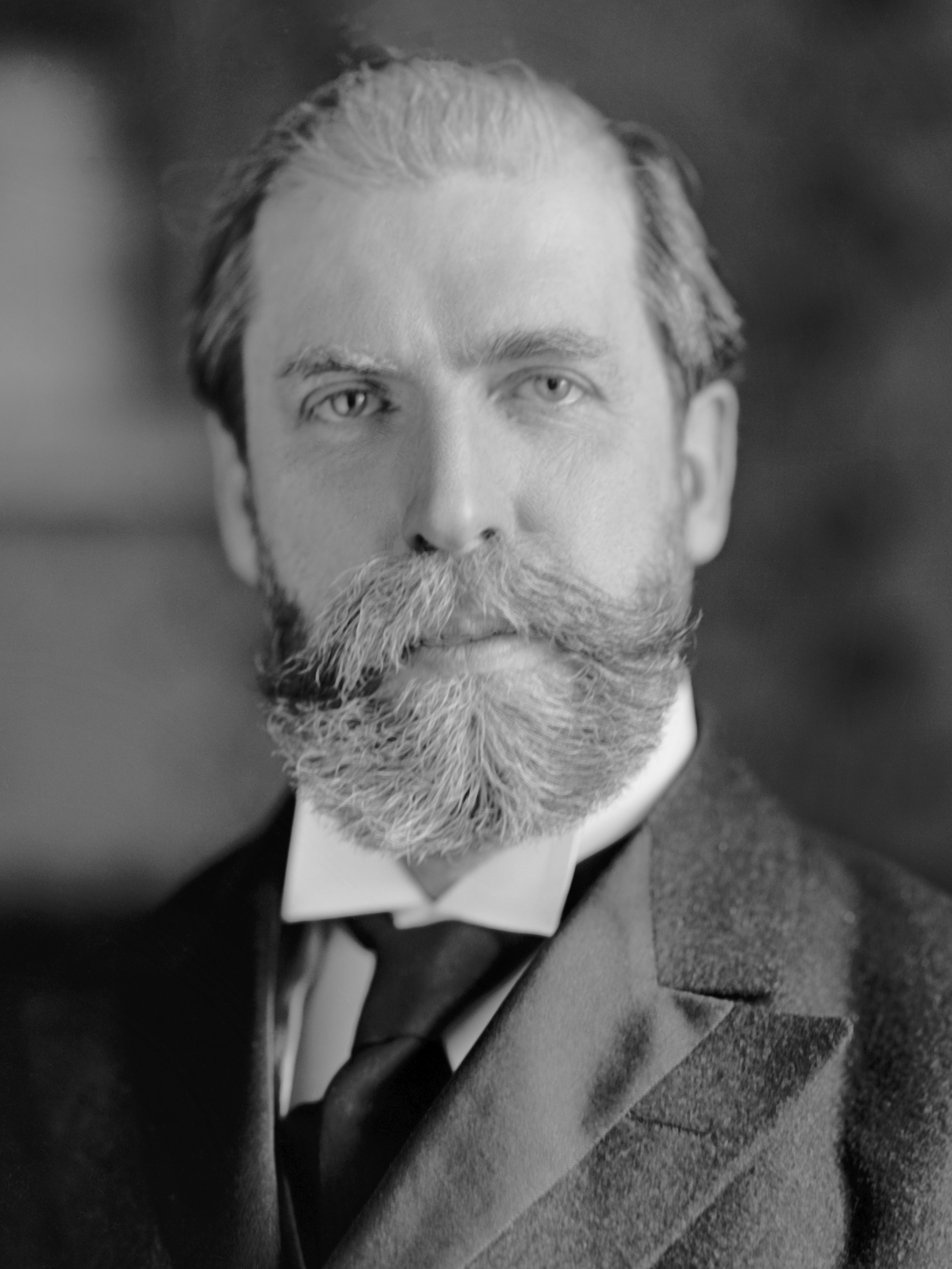

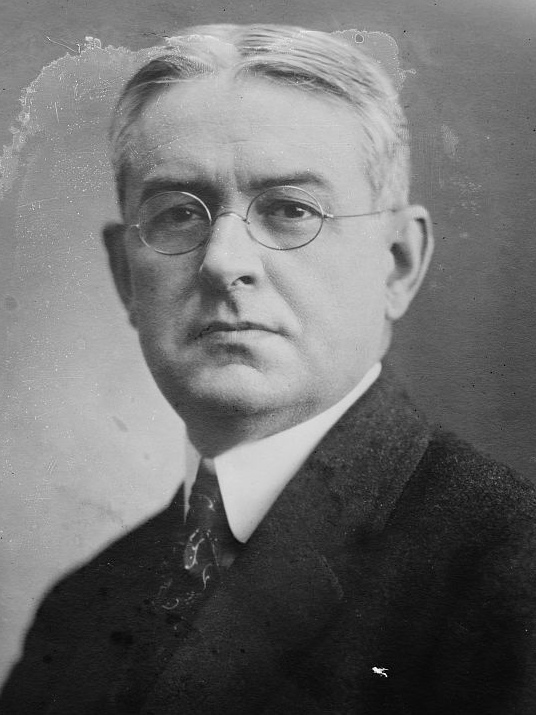
| Nominee | Charles Evans Hughes | Woodrow Wilson | Allan L. Benson |
| Party | Republican | Democratic | Socialist |
| Home state | New York | New Jersey | New York |
| Running mate | Charles W. Fairbanks | Thomas R. Marshall | George Ross Kirkpatrick |
| Electoral vote | 12 | 0 | 0 |
| Popular vote | 179,544 | 179,152 | 20,117 |
| Percentage | 46.35% | 46.25% | 5.19% |
County results
Hughes
40–50%
50–60%
60–70%
Wilson
30–40%
40–50%
50–60%
President before election
Woodrow Wilson
Democratic
Elected President
Woodrow Wilson
Democratic

The 1916 United States presidential election in Minnesota took place on November 7, 1916, as part of the 1916 United States presidential election. Minnesota voters chose 12 electors to the Electoral College, which selected the president and vice president. Minnesota held its first Presidential Primary on March 14, 1916.

Minnesota was won by the Republican candidate, former Associate Justice of the Supreme Court Charles Evans Hughes won the state over incumbent President Woodrow Wilson by a margin of just 392 votes, or 0.1011968% (one vote in 988). This is the fifteenth-closest statewide presidential election on record, and although it was only the second-closest result in 1916 after New Hampshire, there was not to be a closer result until Adlai Stevenson II won Kentucky in 1952 by 700 of 993,148 votes.

Wilson's performance was the closest any Democrat had come to carrying the Republican stronghold of Minnesota since Minnesota's statehood inception in 1858 – he was almost five percent ahead of his losing margin in 1912 when the state was won by Progressive Theodore Roosevelt. Wilson comfortably won the urban counties of Ramsey, Hennepin, and St. Louis, which became rigid strongholds for the Democratic Party. Wilson also led Hughes in the socialist strongholds of the forestry- and mining-dominated northern counties. Nevertheless, Hughes won the state with the dominance of the farming districts in the south and his ability to carry fifty-three of eighty-seven state counties. Wilson was however the first Democrat to ever carry Lake, Kandiyohi, Saint Louis, Norman, Todd, Lyon, Murray and Martin Counties, the first to carry Carlton County since Winfield Scott Hancock in 1880, and the first to win Hubbard County since Grover Cleveland in 1888.

As of the 2024 presidential election, this would be the last time that a Democrat would win the presidency without carrying Minnesota, and the only time since statehood that a Democrat won two consecutive terms without ever carrying the state at least once.

== Primary elections ==
=== Republican primary ===
The Republican primary took place on March 14, 1916. Albert B. Cummins, Henry D. Estabrook and William Grant Webster were the three candidates.

1916 Minnesota Republican presidential primary
| Candidate | Votes | % |
|---|---|---|
| Albert B. Cummins | 54,214 | 76.77 |
| Henry D. Estabrook | 12,693 | 17.97 |
| Wm. Grant Webster | 3,710 | 5.25 |
| Total | 70,617 | 100.0 |

=== Democratic primary ===
The Democratic primary took place on March 14, 1916. Incumbent president, Woodrow Wilson, ran unopposed in the Democratic primary.

1916 Minnesota Democratic presidential primary
| Candidate | Votes | % |
|---|---|---|
| Woodrow Wilson | 45,136 | 100.00 |
| Total | 45,136 | 100.0 |

=== Prohibition primary ===
The Prohibition primary took place on March 14, 1916. William Sulzer, Eugene Foss were the two candidates, neither of which were members of the Prohibition party, although Sulzer had been nominated by the Prohibition party for Governor of New York in 1914.

1916 Minnesota Prohibition presidential primary
| Candidate | Votes | % |
|---|---|---|
| William Sulzer | 3,334 | 57.49 |
| Eugene N. Foss | 2,465 | 42.51 |
| Total | 5,799 | 100.0 |

== Results ==
1916 United States presidential election in Minnesota
| Party | Candidate | Votes | Percentage | Electoral votes |
|---|---|---|---|---|
| Republican | Charles Evans Hughes | 179,544 | 46.35% | 12 |
| Democratic | Woodrow Wilson | 179,152 | 46.25% | 0 |
| Socialist | Allan L. Benson | 20,117 | 5.19% | 0 |
| Prohibition | Frank Hanly | 7,793 | 2.01% | 0 |
| Socialist Labor | Arthur E. Reimer | 468 | 0.12% | 0 |
| Progressive | No candidate | 290 | 0.07% | 0 |
| Totals | | 387,364 | 100.00% | 12 |

=== Results by county ===
| County | Charles Evans Hughes Republican | | Woodrow Wilson Democratic | | Allan L. Benson Socialist | | Various candidates Other parties | | Margin | | Total votes cast |
| County | # | % | # | % | # | % | # | % | # | % | Total votes cast |
|---|---|---|---|---|---|---|---|---|---|---|---|
| Aitkin | 1,122 | 46.23% | 877 | 36.14% | 385 | 15.59% | 43 | 1.77% | 245 | 10.09% | 2,427 |
| Anoka | 1,262 | 48.95% | 1,171 | 45.42% | 77 | 2.91% | 68 | 2.64% | 91 | 3.53% | 2,578 |
| Becker | 1,761 | 50.44% | 1,453 | 41.62% | 181 | 5.05% | 96 | 2.75% | 308 | 8.82% | 3,491 |
| Beltrami | 1,331 | 33.04% | 1,912 | 47.47% | 716 | 17.48% | 69 | 1.71% | -581 | -14.42% | 4,028 |
| Benton | 1,020 | 49.09% | 945 | 45.48% | 81 | 3.84% | 32 | 1.54% | 75 | 3.61% | 2,078 |
| Big Stone | 810 | 44.88% | 869 | 48.14% | 77 | 4.15% | 49 | 2.71% | -59 | -3.27% | 1,805 |
| Blue Earth | 2,864 | 53.96% | 2,211 | 41.65% | 95 | 1.74% | 138 | 2.60% | 653 | 12.30% | 5,308 |
| Brown | 2,078 | 59.68% | 1,101 | 31.62% | 252 | 7.13% | 51 | 1.46% | 977 | 28.06% | 3,482 |
| Carlton | 1,096 | 40.18% | 1,115 | 40.87% | 425 | 15.07% | 92 | 3.37% | -19 | -0.70% | 2,728 |
| Carver | 1,950 | 65.57% | 960 | 32.28% | 34 | 1.13% | 30 | 1.01% | 990 | 33.29% | 2,974 |
| Cass | 982 | 38.21% | 1,260 | 49.03% | 281 | 10.74% | 47 | 1.83% | -278 | -10.82% | 2,570 |
| Chippewa | 1,311 | 46.79% | 1,134 | 40.47% | 261 | 9.01% | 96 | 3.43% | 177 | 6.32% | 2,802 |
| Chisago | 1,749 | 61.22% | 944 | 33.04% | 130 | 4.50% | 34 | 1.19% | 805 | 28.18% | 2,857 |
| Clay | 1,549 | 44.79% | 1,716 | 49.62% | 104 | 2.93% | 89 | 2.57% | -167 | -4.83% | 3,458 |
| Clearwater | 493 | 39.92% | 544 | 44.05% | 158 | 12.39% | 40 | 3.24% | -51 | -4.13% | 1,235 |
| Cook | 125 | 34.44% | 162 | 44.63% | 63 | 16.76% | 13 | 3.58% | -37 | -10.19% | 363 |
| Cottonwood | 1,425 | 60.23% | 762 | 32.21% | 116 | 4.78% | 63 | 2.66% | 663 | 28.02% | 2,366 |
| Crow Wing | 1,715 | 44.42% | 1,568 | 40.61% | 445 | 11.14% | 133 | 3.44% | 147 | 3.81% | 3,861 |
| Dakota | 1,881 | 41.73% | 2,373 | 52.64% | 144 | 3.12% | 110 | 2.44% | -492 | -10.91% | 4,508 |
| Dodge | 1,260 | 55.80% | 895 | 39.64% | 45 | 1.94% | 58 | 2.57% | 365 | 16.16% | 2,258 |
| Douglas | 1,709 | 50.26% | 1,398 | 41.12% | 176 | 5.00% | 117 | 3.44% | 311 | 9.15% | 3,400 |
| Faribault | 2,184 | 61.71% | 1,123 | 31.73% | 76 | 2.06% | 156 | 4.41% | 1,061 | 29.98% | 3,539 |
| Fillmore | 2,945 | 65.20% | 1,313 | 29.07% | 92 | 1.96% | 167 | 3.70% | 1,632 | 36.13% | 4,517 |
| Freeborn | 2,418 | 60.07% | 1,347 | 33.47% | 106 | 2.54% | 154 | 3.83% | 1,071 | 26.61% | 4,025 |
| Goodhue | 2,471 | 53.09% | 1,875 | 40.29% | 122 | 2.09% | 186 | 3.29% | 1,596 | 28.23% | 4,654 |
| Grant | 878 | 49.19% | 778 | 43.59% | 66 | 3.57% | 63 | 3.53% | 100 | 5.60% | 1,785 |
| Hennepin | 27,957 | 40.78% | 36,395 | 53.09% | 3,302 | 4.75% | 902 | 1.32% | -8,438 | -12.31% | 68,556 |
| Houston | 1,783 | 69.08% | 744 | 28.83% | 23 | 0.88% | 31 | 1.20% | 1,039 | 40.26% | 2,581 |
| Hubbard | 685 | 40.39% | 799 | 47.11% | 171 | 9.84% | 41 | 2.42% | -114 | -6.72% | 1,696 |
| Isanti | 1,123 | 48.18% | 935 | 40.11% | 217 | 9.09% | 56 | 2.40% | 188 | 8.07% | 2,331 |
| Itasca | 1,163 | 36.89% | 1,504 | 47.70% | 429 | 13.36% | 57 | 1.81% | -341 | -10.82% | 3,153 |
| Jackson | 1,503 | 51.95% | 1,272 | 43.97% | 75 | 2.55% | 43 | 1.49% | 231 | 7.98% | 2,893 |
| Kanabec | 776 | 49.02% | 608 | 38.41% | 174 | 10.82% | 25 | 1.58% | 168 | 10.61% | 1,583 |
| Kandiyohi | 1,612 | 41.82% | 1,968 | 51.05% | 167 | 4.21% | 108 | 2.80% | -356 | -9.23% | 3,855 |
| Kittson | 709 | 43.98% | 749 | 46.46% | 107 | 6.45% | 47 | 2.92% | -40 | -2.48% | 1,612 |
| Koochiching | 474 | 25.68% | 1,089 | 58.99% | 255 | 13.61% | 28 | 1.52% | -615 | -33.32% | 1,846 |
| Lac qui Parle | 1,614 | 56.30% | 1,047 | 36.52% | 100 | 3.36% | 106 | 3.70% | 567 | 19.78% | 2,867 |
| Lake | 401 | 30.22% | 506 | 38.13% | 366 | 26.50% | 54 | 4.07% | -105 | -7.91% | 1,327 |
| Le Sueur | 1,430 | 43.89% | 1,723 | 52.89% | 53 | 1.60% | 52 | 1.60% | -293 | -8.99% | 3,258 |
| Lincoln | 777 | 38.18% | 1,174 | 57.69% | 40 | 1.92% | 44 | 2.16% | -397 | -19.51% | 2,035 |
| Lyon | 1,389 | 38.97% | 1,893 | 53.11% | 200 | 5.49% | 82 | 2.30% | -504 | -14.14% | 3,564 |
| McLeod | 1,772 | 55.22% | 1,305 | 40.67% | 69 | 2.11% | 63 | 1.96% | 467 | 14.55% | 3,209 |
| Mahnomen | 262 | 36.39% | 411 | 57.08% | 43 | 5.94% | 4 | 0.56% | -149 | -20.69% | 720 |
| Marshall | 1,461 | 44.73% | 1,513 | 46.33% | 204 | 6.08% | 88 | 2.69% | -52 | -1.59% | 3,266 |
| Martin | 1,741 | 47.16% | 1,756 | 47.56% | 88 | 2.32% | 107 | 2.90% | -15 | -0.41% | 3,692 |
| Meeker | 1,780 | 52.69% | 1,475 | 43.66% | 67 | 1.95% | 56 | 1.66% | 305 | 9.03% | 3,378 |
| Mille Lacs | 1,127 | 44.58% | 1,113 | 44.03% | 248 | 9.66% | 40 | 1.58% | 14 | 0.55% | 2,528 |
| Morrison | 1,887 | 48.84% | 1,650 | 42.70% | 225 | 5.67% | 102 | 2.64% | 237 | 6.13% | 3,864 |
| Mower | 2,520 | 59.43% | 1,572 | 37.08% | 64 | 1.48% | 84 | 1.98% | 948 | 22.36% | 4,240 |
| Murray | 1,137 | 46.64% | 1,193 | 48.93% | 69 | 2.79% | 39 | 1.60% | -56 | -2.30% | 2,438 |
| Nicollet | 1,288 | 58.44% | 814 | 36.93% | 38 | 1.68% | 64 | 2.90% | 474 | 21.51% | 2,204 |
| Nobles | 1,413 | 50.39% | 1,280 | 45.65% | 46 | 1.60% | 65 | 2.32% | 133 | 4.74% | 2,804 |
| Norman | 1,046 | 42.11% | 1,076 | 43.32% | 227 | 8.67% | 135 | 5.43% | -30 | -1.21% | 2,484 |
| Olmsted | 2,101 | 49.67% | 1,926 | 45.53% | 90 | 2.07% | 113 | 2.67% | 175 | 4.14% | 4,230 |
| Otter Tail | 4,238 | 53.81% | 2,858 | 36.29% | 502 | 6.09% | 278 | 3.49% | 1,470 | 18.45% | 7,876 |
| Pennington | 868 | 40.47% | 1,004 | 46.81% | 237 | 10.87% | 36 | 1.68% | -136 | -6.34% | 2,145 |
| Pine | 1,531 | 44.38% | 1,507 | 43.68% | 341 | 9.68% | 71 | 2.06% | 24 | 0.70% | 3,450 |
| Pipestone | 1,010 | 52.44% | 732 | 38.01% | 151 | 7.71% | 33 | 1.71% | 278 | 14.43% | 1,926 |
| Polk | 2,471 | 37.93% | 3,498 | 53.70% | 381 | 5.71% | 164 | 2.52% | -1,027 | -15.77% | 6,514 |
| Pope | 1,321 | 51.18% | 1,121 | 43.43% | 57 | 2.14% | 82 | 3.18% | 200 | 7.75% | 2,581 |
| Ramsey | 13,317 | 35.08% | 22,291 | 58.72% | 1,684 | 4.36% | 669 | 1.76% | -8,974 | -23.64% | 37,961 |
| Red Lake | 463 | 37.70% | 694 | 56.51% | 50 | 4.00% | 21 | 1.71% | -231 | -18.81% | 1,228 |
| Redwood | 2,029 | 56.98% | 1,361 | 38.22% | 121 | 3.35% | 50 | 1.40% | 668 | 18.76% | 3,561 |
| Renville | 2,432 | 55.25% | 1,660 | 37.71% | 115 | 2.50% | 195 | 4.43% | 772 | 17.54% | 4,402 |
| Rice | 2,408 | 51.66% | 2,083 | 44.69% | 56 | 1.17% | 114 | 2.45% | 325 | 6.97% | 4,661 |
| Rock | 1,196 | 59.68% | 705 | 35.18% | 66 | 3.23% | 37 | 1.85% | 491 | 24.50% | 2,004 |
| Roseau | 821 | 38.71% | 834 | 39.32% | 405 | 18.56% | 61 | 2.88% | -13 | -0.61% | 2,121 |
| Saint Louis | 10,834 | 41.47% | 12,056 | 46.15% | 2,544 | 9.49% | 690 | 2.64% | -1,222 | -4.68% | 26,124 |
| Scott | 972 | 40.86% | 1,361 | 57.21% | 13 | 0.54% | 33 | 1.39% | -389 | -16.35% | 2,379 |
| Sherburne | 965 | 54.09% | 731 | 40.98% | 41 | 2.24% | 47 | 2.63% | 234 | 13.12% | 1,784 |
| Sibley | 1,737 | 62.37% | 973 | 34.94% | 37 | 1.31% | 38 | 1.36% | 764 | 27.43% | 2,785 |
| Stearns | 4,312 | 54.44% | 3,350 | 42.29% | 141 | 1.75% | 118 | 1.49% | 962 | 12.14% | 7,921 |
| Steele | 1,734 | 52.20% | 1,497 | 45.06% | 41 | 1.22% | 50 | 1.51% | 237 | 7.13% | 3,322 |
| Stevens | 943 | 52.56% | 787 | 43.87% | 24 | 1.31% | 40 | 2.23% | 156 | 8.70% | 1,794 |
| Swift | 1,335 | 50.21% | 1,181 | 44.42% | 85 | 3.13% | 58 | 2.18% | 154 | 5.79% | 2,659 |
| Todd | 1,919 | 44.50% | 1,922 | 44.57% | 339 | 7.63% | 132 | 3.06% | -3 | -0.07% | 4,312 |
| Traverse | 774 | 48.71% | 779 | 49.02% | 27 | 1.69% | 9 | 0.57% | -5 | -0.31% | 1,589 |
| Wabasha | 1,787 | 53.11% | 1,449 | 43.06% | 41 | 1.19% | 88 | 2.62% | 338 | 10.04% | 3,365 |
| Wadena | 938 | 54.31% | 651 | 37.70% | 116 | 6.63% | 22 | 1.27% | 287 | 16.62% | 1,727 |
| Waseca | 1,522 | 54.11% | 1,178 | 41.88% | 47 | 1.63% | 66 | 2.35% | 344 | 12.23% | 2,813 |
| Washington | 2,167 | 53.55% | 1,610 | 39.78% | 149 | 3.57% | 121 | 2.99% | 557 | 13.76% | 4,047 |
| Watonwan | 1,300 | 59.94% | 801 | 36.93% | 30 | 1.36% | 38 | 1.75% | 499 | 23.01% | 2,169 |
| Wilkin | 690 | 44.20% | 808 | 51.76% | 42 | 2.65% | 21 | 1.35% | -118 | -7.56% | 1,561 |
| Winona | 2,916 | 47.94% | 2,907 | 47.80% | 133 | 2.14% | 126 | 2.07% | 9 | 0.15% | 6,082 |
| Wright | 2,683 | 52.24% | 2,262 | 44.04% | 87 | 1.66% | 104 | 2.02% | 421 | 8.20% | 5,136 |
| Yellow Medicine | 1,501 | 50.08% | 1,238 | 41.31% | 149 | 4.80% | 109 | 3.64% | 263 | 8.78% | 2,997 |
| Totals | 179,544 | 46.35% | 179,152 | 46.25% | 20,117 | 5.08% | 8,551 | 2.21% | 392 | 0.10% | 387,364 |

== See also ==
- United States presidential elections in Minnesota
