= 2020 Minnesota Republican presidential primary =

- March 3, 2020

39 Republican National Convention delegates

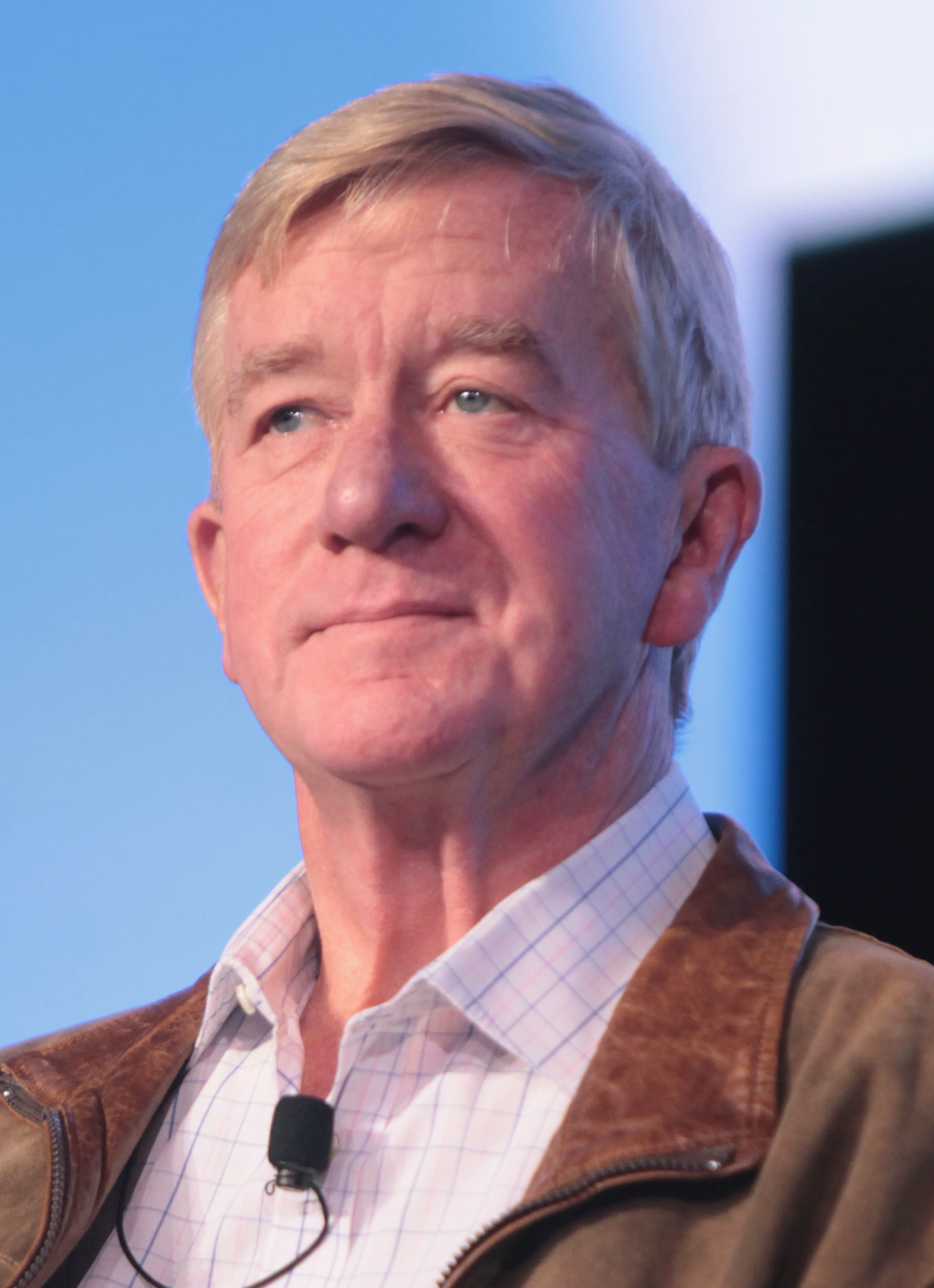
Candidate	Donald Trump	Bill Weld (write-in)
Home state	Florida	Massachusetts
Delegate count	39	0
Popular vote	137,275	443
Percentage	97.67%	0.32%

The 2020 Minnesota Republican presidential primary took place on March 3, 2020, as one of 14 contests scheduled for Super Tuesday in the Republican Party primaries for the 2020 presidential election.

== Results ==
2020 Minnesota Republican primary
Candidate	Votes	%	Delegates
Donald Trump	137,275	97.67	39
Bill Weld (write-in) (Note: The candidate is a write-in because only Donald Trump was on the ballot.)	443	0.32	0
Rocky De La Fuente (write-in)	16	0.01	0
Other write-ins	2,821	2.01	0
Total	140,555	100%	39

=== Results by county ===
2020 Minnesota Republican primary (results per county) (Note: The results are official because they were certified by the State Canvassing Board on March 10, 2020 before being retrieved on March 29, 2020.)
County	Donald Trump		Write-ins		Total votes cast
County	Votes	%	Votes	%	Total votes cast
Aitkin	1,075	98.99	11	1.01	1,086
Anoka	7,987	97.41	212	2.59	8,199
Becker	1,201	98.12	23	1.88	1,224
Beltrami	1,510	98.63	21	1.37	1,531
Benton	1,186	98.50	18	1.50	1,204
Big Stone	415	99.28	3	0.72	418
Blue Earth	1,729	97.68	41	2.32	1,770
Brown	1,099	99.19	9	0.81	1,108
Carlton	1,152	97.88	25	2.12	1,177
Carver	2,336	97.54	59	2.46	2,395
Cass	1,987	99.20	16	0.80	2,003
Chippewa	589	98.49	9	1.51	598
Chisago	1,661	98.81	20	1.19	1,681
Clay	1,078	96.16	43	3.84	1,121
Clearwater	519	98.48	8	1.52	527
Cook	370	99.73	1	0.27	371
Cottonwood	366	96.83	12	3.17	378
Crow Wing	2,478	98.96	26	1.04	2,504
Dakota	8,352	97.08	251	2.92	8,603
Dodge	472	98.13	9	1.87	481
Douglas	1,210	98.37	20	1.63	1,230
Faribault	642	99.23	5	0.77	647
Fillmore	784	98.25	14	1.75	798
Freeborn	1,196	99.17	10	0.83	1,206
Goodhue	1,322	98.29	23	1.71	1,345
Grant	526	99.43	3	0.57	529
Hennepin	16,605	95.38	804	4.62	17,409
Houston	538	97.46	14	2.54	552
Hubbard	1,113	98.23	20	1.77	1,133
Isanti	1,305	98.94	14	1.06	1,319
Itasca	2,925	99.15	25	0.85	2,950
Jackson	560	98.94	6	1.06	566
Kanabec	630	99.06	6	0.94	636
Kandiyohi	1,279	98.23	23	1.77	1,302
Kittson	371	98.93	4	1.07	375
Koochiching	822	98.92	9	1.08	831
Lac qui Parle	466	99.79	1	0.21	467
Lake	532	97.97	11	2.03	543
Lake of the Woods	594	99.50	3	0.50	597
Le Sueur	1,276	98.61	18	1.39	1,294
Lincoln	197	97.52	5	2.48	202
Lyon	935	98.42	15	1.58	950
Mahnomen	1,160	98.47	18	1.53	1,178
Marshall	245	98.79	3	1.21	248
Martin	952	99.37	6	0.63	958
McLeod	644	98.92	7	1.08	651
Meeker	987	99.00	10	1.00	997
Mille Lacs	902	98.69	12	1.31	914
Morrison	1,915	99.33	13	0.67	1,928
Mower	1,218	98.62	17	1.38	1,235
Murray	607	99.35	4	0.65	611
Nicollet	1,074	98.17	20	1.83	1,094
Nobles	811	97.83	18	2.17	829
Norman	380	98.70	5	1.30	385
Olmsted	3,436	96.49	125	3.51	3,561
Otter Tail	2,400	98.52	36	1.48	2,436
Pennington	467	98.94	5	1.06	472
Pine	1,274	99.14	11	0.86	1,285
Pipestone	679	99.27	5	0.73	684
Polk	1,647	99.28	12	0.72	1,659
Pope	540	98.36	9	1.64	549
Ramsey	6,185	94.37	369	5.63	6,554
Red Lake	291	99.66	1	0.34	292
Redwood	474	99.37	3	0.63	477
Renville	396	98.51	6	1.49	402
Rice	1,428	97.74	33	2.26	1,461
Rock	635	98.91	7	1.09	642
Roseau	1,055	99.81	2	0.19	1,057
Saint Louis	5,260	97.52	134	2.48	5,394
Scott	3,144	97.49	81	2.51	3,225
Sherburne	2,805	98.70	37	1.30	2,842
Sibley	687	98.57	10	1.43	697
Stearns	4,149	98.32	71	1.68	4,220
Steele	1,110	97.71	26	2.29	1,136
Stevens	616	99.35	4	0.65	620
Swift	460	97.87	10	2.13	470
Todd	791	99.50	4	0.50	795
Traverse	276	100.00	0	0	276
Wabasha	678	98.69	9	1.31	687
Wadena	573	99.31	4	0.69	577
Waseca	504	97.86	11	2.14	515
Washington	5,023	96.84	164	3.16	5,187
Watonwan	615	98.40	10	1.60	625
Wilkin	399	99.01	4	0.99	403
Winona	1,220	97.68	29	2.32	1,249
Wright	3,298	98.77	41	1.23	3,339
Yellow Medicine	475	99.16	4	0.84	479
Total	137,275	97.67	3,280	2.33	140,555
