= Minnesota presidential primary =

A Minnesota presidential primary has been held six times: 1916, 1952, 1956, 1992, 2020 and 2024. The state of Minnesota has normally held presidential caucuses instead. On May 22, 2016, Minnesota Governor Mark Dayton signed a bill that reinstated a presidential primary starting in 2020.

== 1916 ==
The first Minnesota presidential primary was held on Tuesday, March 14, 1916. Along with the Democratic and Republican parties, the Prohibition Party also held a primary. The Progressive Party (Bull Moose) was eligible to hold an election but no candidates filed. The 1916 primary was the only Minnesota primary to also feature a primary for Vice President. Only the Prohibition Party held a contest.

=== Winners ===
- Democratic Party: Woodrow Wilson
- Prohibition Party: William Sulzer
- Republican Party: Albert B. Cummins

== 1952 ==
The second Minnesota presidential primary was held on Tuesday, March 18, 1952.

=== Winners ===
- Democratic Farmer Labor Party: Hubert Humphrey "favorite son candidate"
- Republican Party: Harold Stassen

== 1956 ==
The third Minnesota presidential primary was held on Tuesday, March 20, 1956. The primary may have had a major role in the end of the political career of Coya Knutson, the first woman elected Representative from Minnesota. To win a possible vice presidential nomination for its rising star, Senator Hubert Humphrey the Democratic Farmer Labor Party attempted to ensure that Stevenson would win the Minnesota primary. However Knutson endorsed and campaigned on behalf of Estes Kefauver of Tennessee, believing his agricultural policy positions would be more beneficial to her constituents. In part due to Knutson's efforts, Kefauver won the Primary; as a result, when Stevenson was ultimately nominated, Kefauver was chosen as his running mate. In a letter signed by Knutson's husband that was published by newspapers under the headline Coya Come Home helping to defeat Knutson's re-election. It has been alleged that either DFL state leadership or local operatives wrote the letter and bribed Knutson's husband to sign it, in revenge for denying Humphrey a shot at the 1956 vice presidential nomination.

=== Winners ===
- Democratic Farmer Labor Party: Estes Kefauver
- Republican Party: Dwight Eisenhower

== 1992 ==
The fourth Minnesota presidential primary was held on Tuesday, April 7, 1992. The closed primary was binding for the Independent Republican Party, but for the Democratic Farmer Labor Party it was only a "beauty contest" as the DFL awarded its delegates at March 3 caucuses to Senator Tom Harkin of Iowa.

=== Winners ===
- Democratic Farmer Labor Party: Bill Clinton
- Independent Republican Party: George H. W. Bush

== 2020 ==
The fifth Minnesota presidential primary was held on Tuesday, March 3, 2020. However, controversy over the Republican Party of Minnesota excluding challengers to incumbent president Donald Trump sparked a legal challenge by James Martin, a voter, and Rocky De La Fuente, a presidential candidate, jeopardizing the Minnesota Secretary of State from being able to print the ballots for both the Democratic and Republican primary elections. Ultimately, the Minnesota Supreme Court ordered Minnesota's primary to continue as planned, leaving the incumbent president as Republican voters' only option. Two other major parties, the Grassroots–Legalize Cannabis Party and the Legal Marijuana Now Party, did not hold a primary.

=== Winners ===
- Democratic Farmer Labor Party: Joe Biden
- Republican Party: Donald Trump

== 2024 ==
The sixth Minnesota presidential primary was held on Tuesday, March 5, 2024. In this primary, the Legal Marijuana Now Party joined alongside Democratic and Republican at the same time, and also on Super Tuesday.

=== Winners ===
- Democratic Farmer Labor Party: Joe Biden
- Republican Party: Donald Trump
- Legal Marijuana Now Party: Krystal Gabel
