= Bing Mi =

Chinese restaurant in Portland, Oregon, U.S.

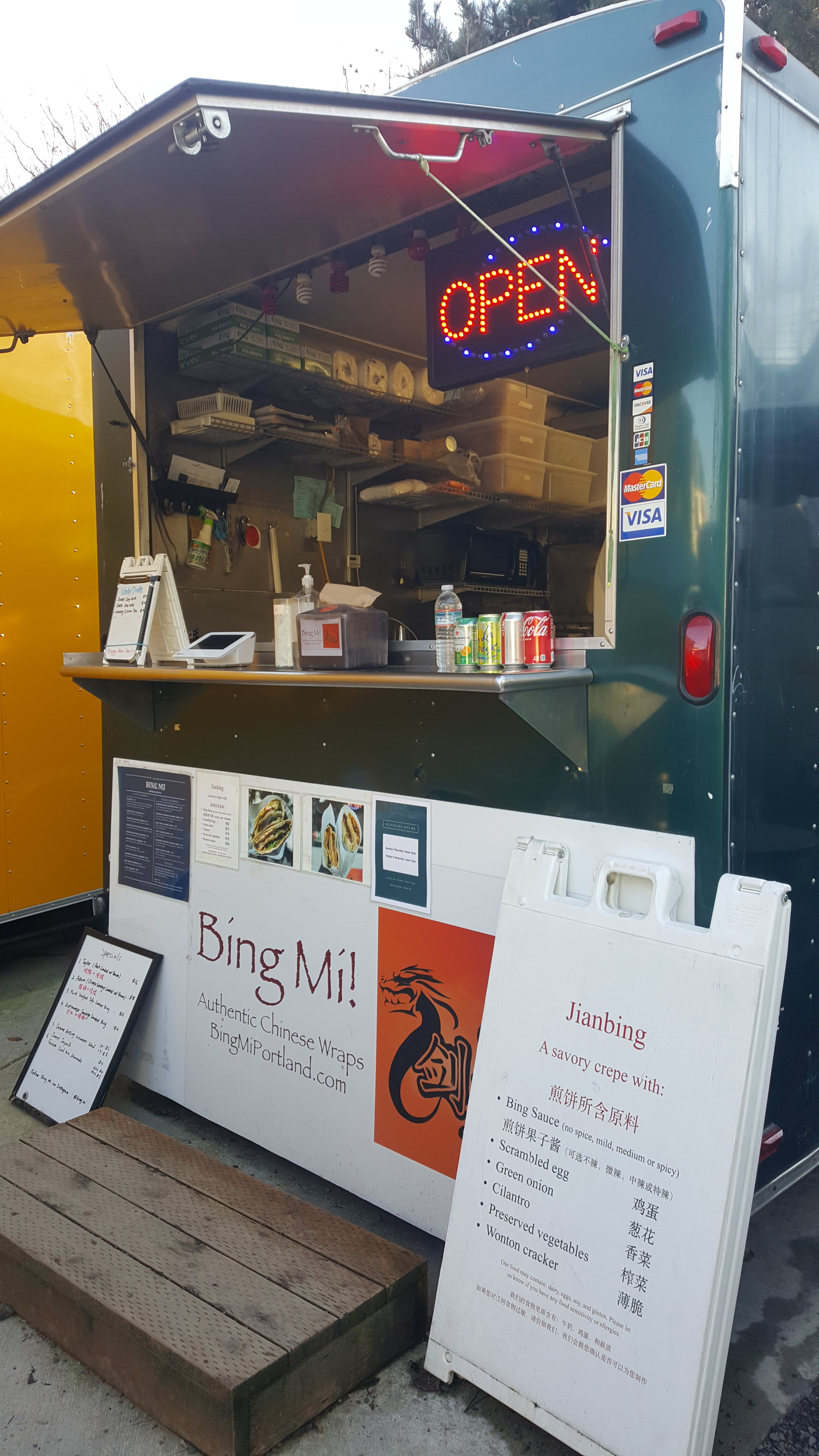
- The food cart in Portland, Oregon's Northwest District, 2022
- Interactive map of Bing Mi

Restaurant information
- Owner: Jacky Ren
- Previous owners: Tim Harris; Alisa Grandy; Neal Grandy
- Food type: Chinese
- Location: 2572 Northwest Vaughn Street, Portland, Multnomah, Oregon, 97210, United States
- Coordinates: 45.5367°N 122.7043°W
- Website: bingmipdx.com

Bing Mi (sometimes stylized as Bing Mi!) is a Chinese restaurant in Portland, Oregon, United States. The original food cart specialized in the Chinese street food jianbing. The brick and mortar Bing Mi Dumpling and Noodle Bar opened in 2022 and focuses on Northern Chinese noodles and dumplings.

== Description and history ==
Owners Tim Harris and Alisa and Neal Grandy began operating Bing Mi at the Alder Street food cart pod in 2014. Jacky (or Jackie) Ren has also been credited as a co-owner. The food cart serves many variations of jianbing, and was Portland's only restaurant offering the Chinese street food at the time. Optional ingredients include bacon, roast duck, and spam.

In 2017, owners confirmed plans to open a second food cart in southeast Portland. Andrew Zimmern visited Bing Mi for an episode of the Travel Channel's The Zimmern List. In 2020, the business donated proceeds to people affected by local wildfires and partnered with Adopt a Restaurant to help feed people in need during the COVID-19 pandemic.

Ren bought out the other owners in 2020 and re-opened the food cart at the Nob Hill Food Carts in northwest Portland's Northwest District, following the closure of the Alder Street pod. In 2021, Ren confirmed plans to open Bing Mi Dumpling and Noodle Bar in the Northwest District in 2022. The brick and mortar restaurant opened in January, focusing on Northern Chinese noodles and dumplings. Food cart staff have work at the noodle restaurant during heat waves. The food cart closed on December 30, 2023, to prepare for a reopening in downtown Portland in March 2024, according to Eater Portland. Bing Mi opened in the Midtown Beer Garden in 2024.

Bing Mi has collaborated with Bark City BBQ.

== Reception ==
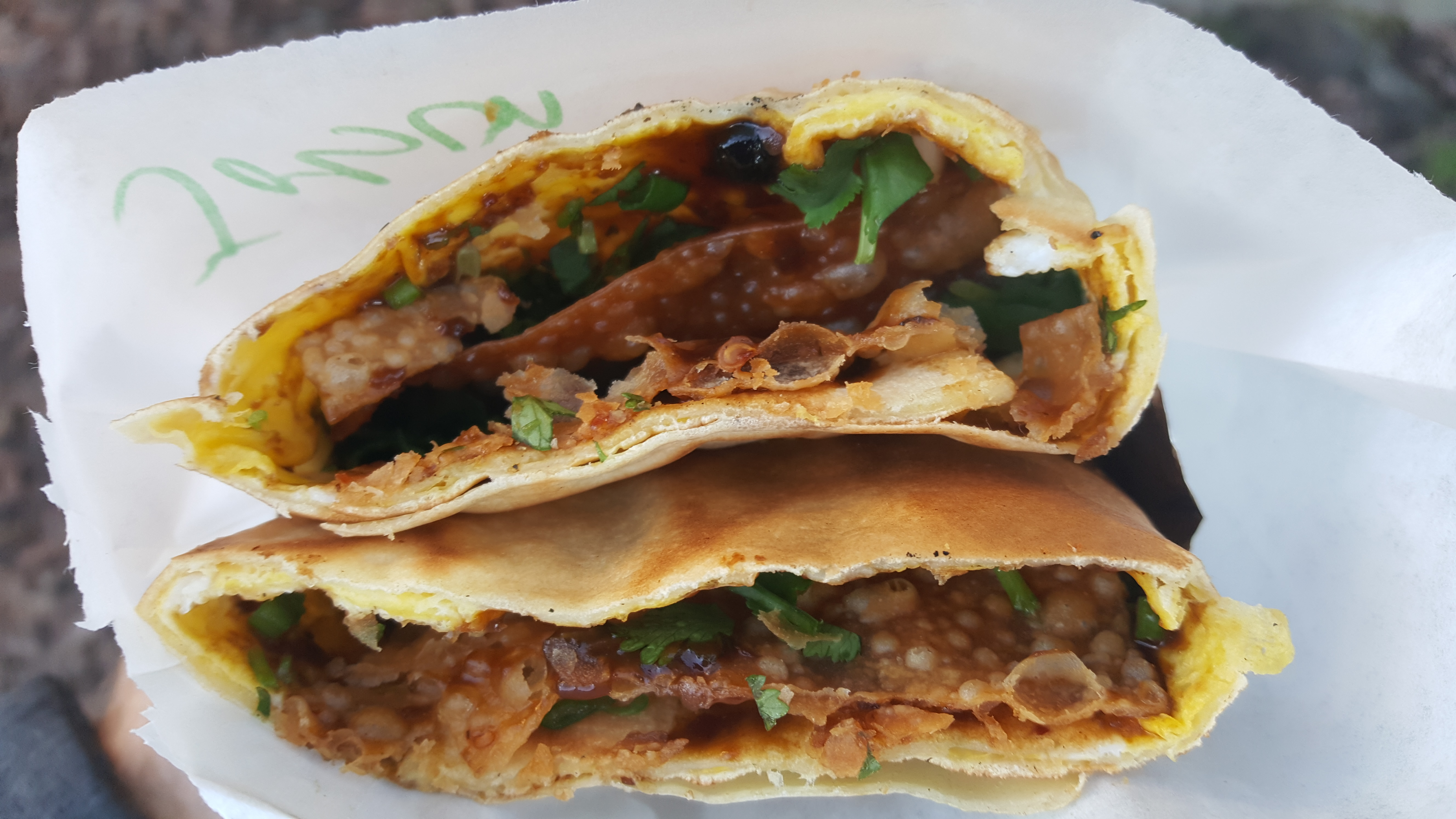
Bing Mi's classic jianbing

Danielle Centoni of Condé Nast Traveler said Bing Mi "has spawned its own cult following". Matthew Korfhage of Willamette Week said, "The jian bing is flat-out fantastic, whether with or without the sweet Chinese sausage you can tack on for a buck. Indeed, the meat texture is a bit of a fifth wheel amid the already bustling party of flavors." Thrillist's Drew Tyson ranked Bing Mi at the top of his list of Portland's best new food carts. He recommend the optional sausage and wrote, "The experience is funky and flavorful and unlike anything else you'll find on the streets of Portland." In 2018, the website's Pete Cottell included Bing Mi in his list of "Portland's Most Delicious Food Carts and Where to Find Them".

In 2017, Samantha Bakall included Bing Mi in The Oregonian's lists of downtown Portland's 13 best "cheap eats" and 10 best food carts. The Portland Mercury included the business in a 2019 list of Portland's 50 best multicultural restaurants and food carts. Matthew Trueherz included the classic jianbing in Portland Monthly's 2022 list of "12 Favorite Budget-Friendly Dishes Under $12".

In 2018, Eater Portland's Brooke Jackson-Glidden said Bing Mi "accrued rave reviews and serious lines for its pretty traditional version with egg and chili paste". She and Nick Woo included the business in the website's 2021 "Guide to Portland's Most Outstanding Food Carts", and she and Seiji Nanbu included Bing Mi in a list of "Where to Find Outstanding Chinese Food in Portland and Beyond". Alex Frane and Maya MacEvoy included Bing Mi in Eater Portland's 2021 list of 16 "quintessential" restaurants and bars in Portland's Slabtown district. Katrina Yentch included the restaurant in the website's 2022 list of "18 Knockout Spots for Affordable Dining in Portland".

In 2024, Bing Mi ranked number 77 in Yelp's list of the 100 best Chinese restaurants in the United States.

== See also ==
- History of Chinese Americans in Portland, Oregon
- List of Chinese restaurants
