= Stretch the Noodle =

Chinese food cart in Portland, Oregon, U.S.

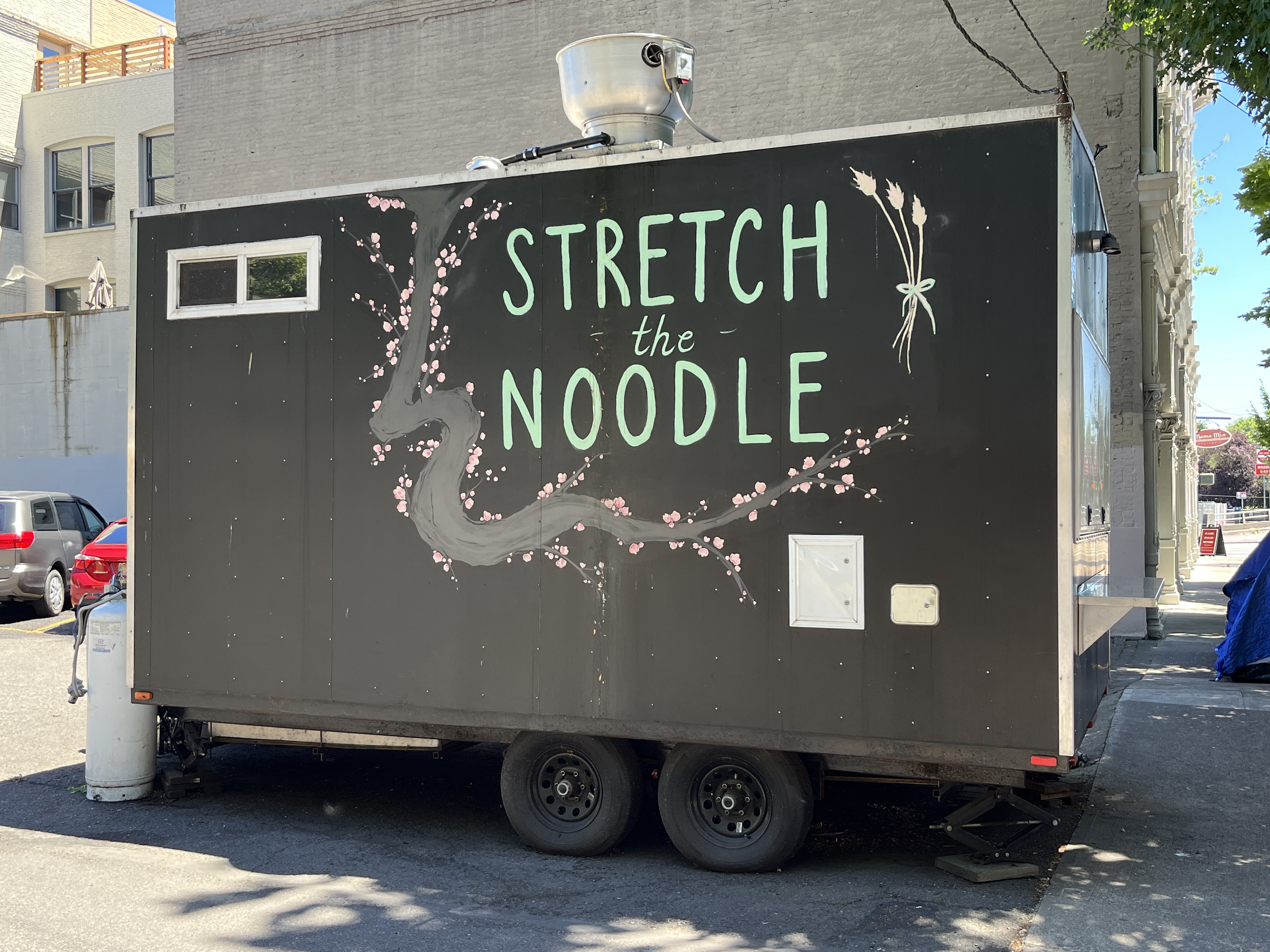
- The food cart in 2023
- Interactive map of Stretch the Noodle

Restaurant information
- Established: May 2016
- Owners: Xuemei Simard; Duane Simard
- Food type: Chinese
- Location: Portland, Oregon, 97204, United States
- Coordinates: 45.5160°N 122.6743°W
- Website: stretch-the-noodle.com

Stretch the Noodle is a restaurant in Portland, Oregon.

== Description ==
Stretch the Noodle, most known for serving Chinese-style hand-stretched noodles, operates from a food cart in downtown Portland's Midtown Beer Garden, and previously elsewhere near the Morrison Bridge. In 2018, Andrea Damewood of the Portland Mercury described Stretch the Noodle as an "unassuming cart with a chalkboard menu and a small speaker playing tinny Chinese music on Southwest Washington". The pale yellow food cart has hand-pulled noodle illustrations on the side.

The chao mian has fried Ota tofu, bell peppers, carrots, mushrooms, and onions. Various noodle options also include chili oil, herbs, and minced pork as ingredients. Beef soup, Chinese crepes (jianbing), dumplings (including pork and shrimp), and stir fries have also been on the menu. The la mian noodles in Sichuan beef soup has braised beef, bok choy, and a broth of five-spice powder and simmered bones.

== History ==
Xuemei Simard, who studied the technique of noodle pulling, is a co-owner with her husband Duane. The business was established in May 2016. In May 2023, the couple announced plans to retire. The food cart, equipment, recipes, and 30 days of training were listed for sale for $80,000. The cart operates at the Midtown Beer Garden, as of August 2023.

== Reception ==
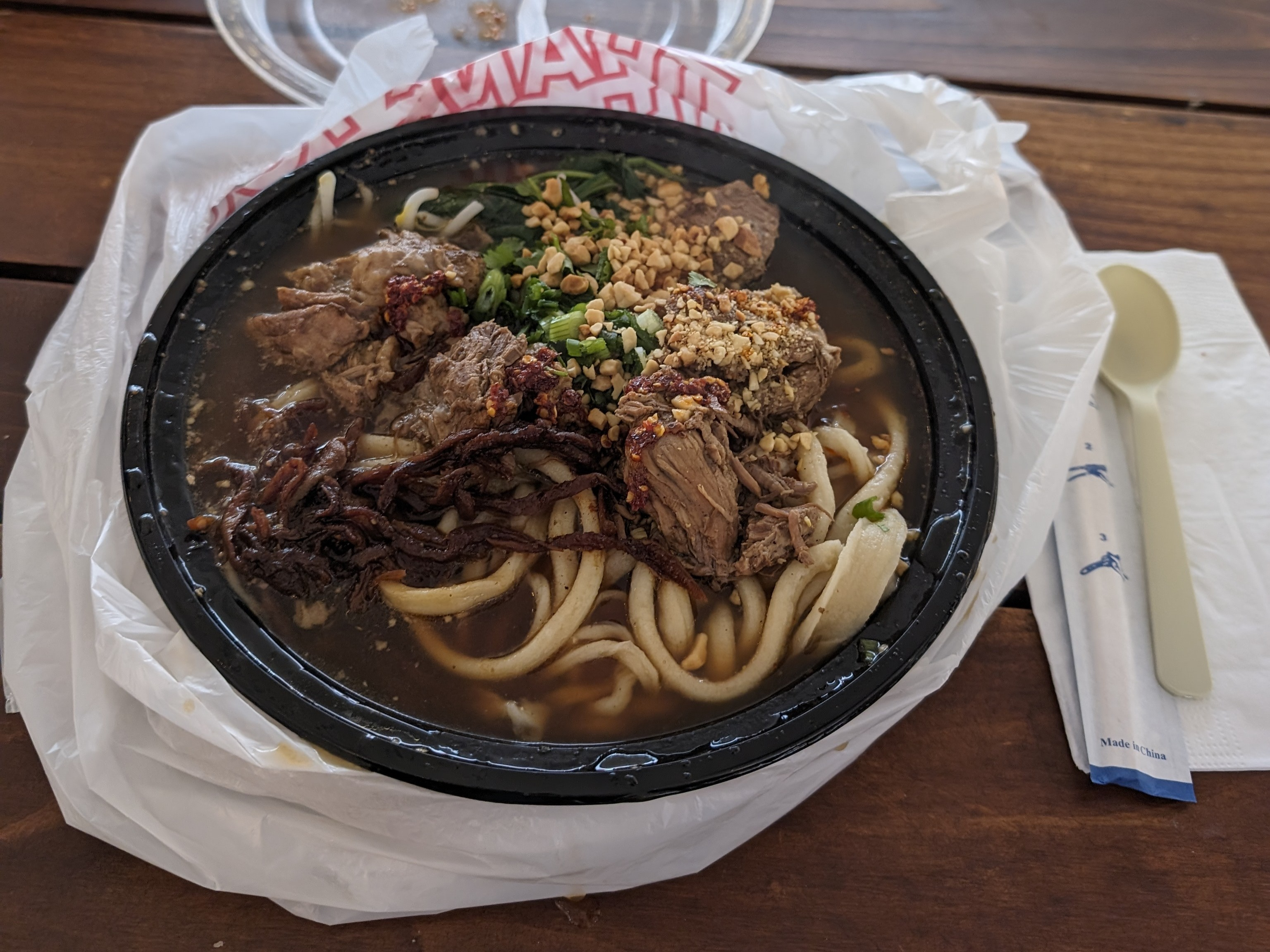
La mian with beef

In 2018, Michael Russell of The Oregonian included Stretch the Noodle in a list of "Portland's best new food carts", and ranked the restaurant number four in the newspaper's list of "Portland's best hand-pulled noodles". In 2019, the Portland Mercury included Stretch the Noodle in a list of the city's 50 best multicultural restaurants and food carts, and Time Out's Jen Woo included the business in an overview of "the best food trucks in Portland to get your grub on".

Jenni Moore of Eater Portland included the chao mian in a 2020 list of 13 "standout" vegetarian meals in Portland. The website's staff included Stretch the Noodle in a 2021 overview "Where to Eat and Drink in Downtown Portland", and Nick Woo and Brooke Jackson-Glidden included the business in a 2022 "Guide to Portland's Most Outstanding Food Carts". The business was also included in Eater Portland's 2022 overview of recommended bars and restaurants in downtown Portland and 2025 lists of the city's best affordable restaurants and food carts.

The Vancouver Sun's Dave Pottinger recommended Stretch the Noodle as a Portland eatery in his 2021 overview of reasons to visit Oregon. He said the restaurant's noodles "are so popular they attract a steady line". Katherine Chew Hamilton of Portland Monthly included Stretch the Noodle for lunch in northwest Portland. Zuri Anderson ranked the business number four in iHeart's 2022 list of the highest-rated Portland restaurants for cheap eats.

== See also ==
- History of Chinese Americans in Portland, Oregon
- List of Chinese restaurants
