= Prem (food) =

Canned meat product

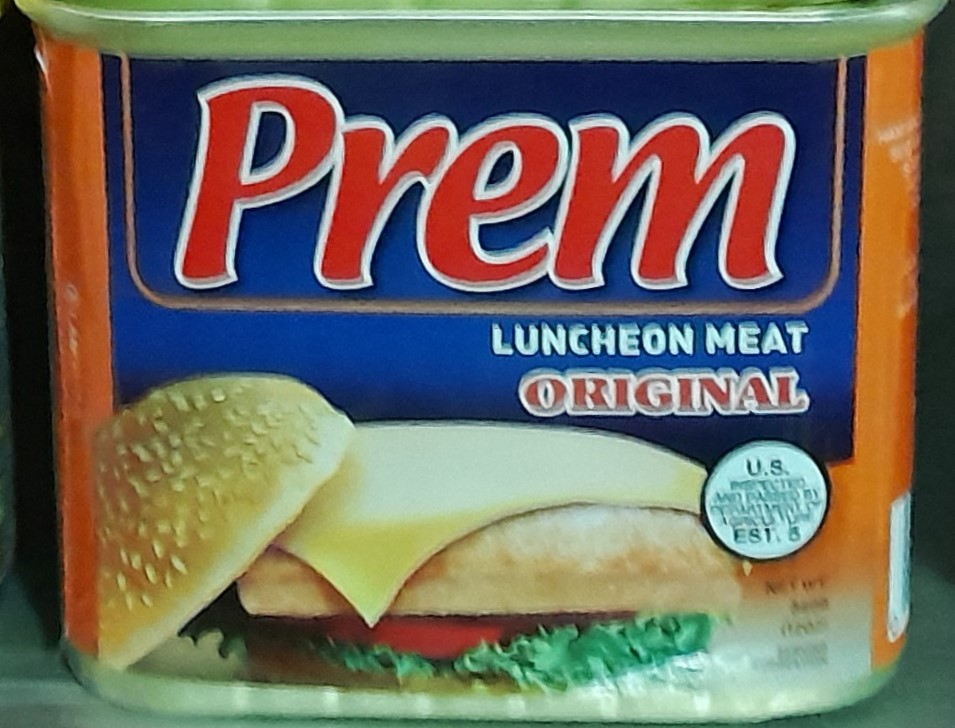
Can of Prem, 2025.

Prem is a brand of canned lunch meat similar to Spam first introduced in 1939 by the original Swift & Company in the United States. The brand is currently owned by Zwanenberg Food Group USA. In Canada, Prem continues to be sold under the Swift umbrella brand and both trademarks are currently owned by Maple Leaf Foods. Prem was shipped to England during World War II.

== See also ==
- Potted meat
- Treet
