= Treet =

Canned meat product

Treet (brand)
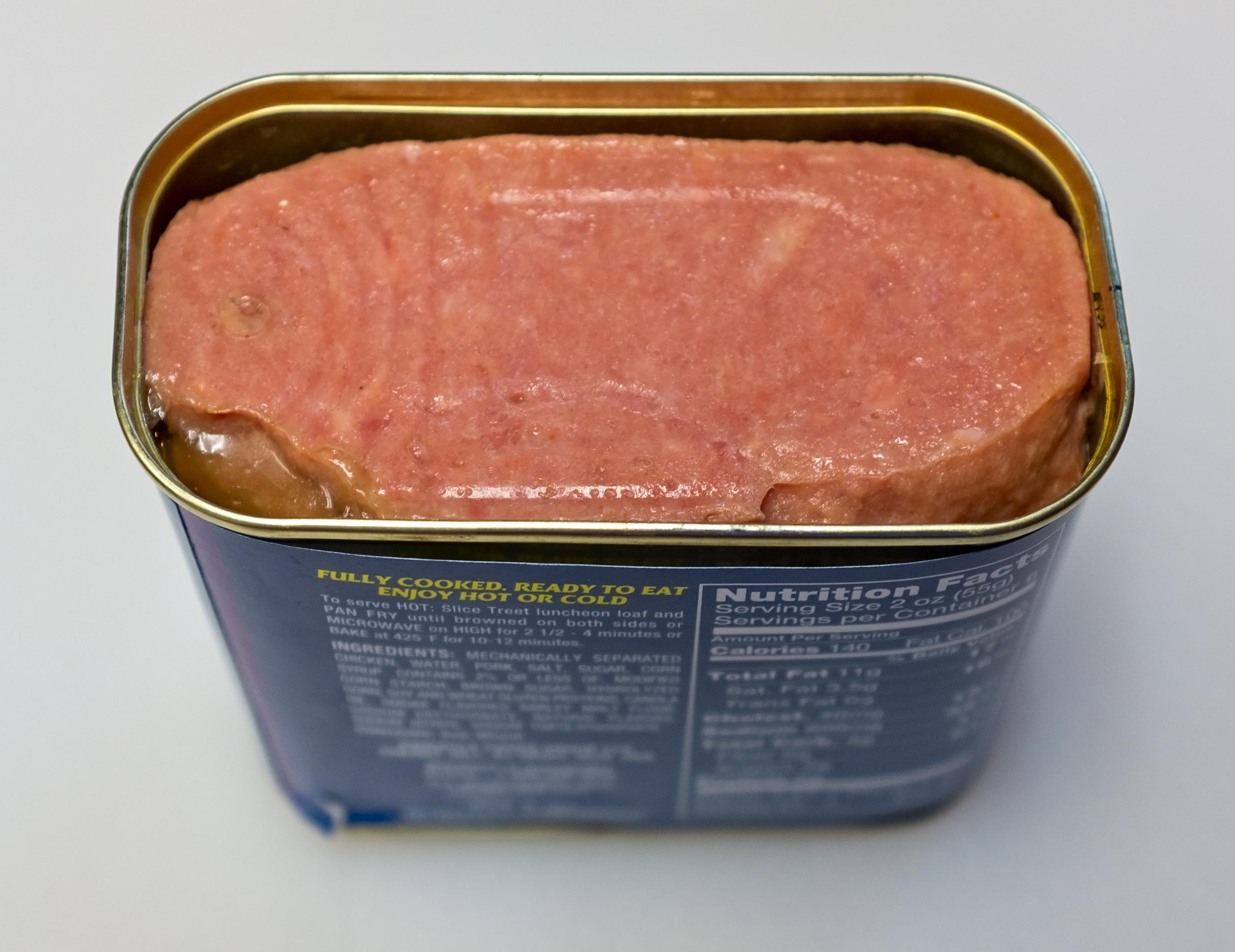
- Armour Treet
- Product type: Canned food
- Current owner: Pinnacle Foods
- Country: United States
- Markets: United States
- Previous owners: Armour and Company (1939–1983), The Dial Corporation (1983–2006)
- Tagline: Any Time is Armour Time
- Website: http://www.armour-star.com

Treet (Armour Star Treet) is a canned lunch meat product similar to Spam first introduced in 1939 by Armour and Company in the United States. Sold as "spiced luncheon loaf", it is made with chicken and pork and has a more finely ground texture than Spam, more akin to bologna or vienna sausages. Like Spam, it is often fried or baked before consumption. Treet is currently manufactured by Pinnacle Foods.

== Nutritional data ==
A 56-gram (approximately two-ounce) serving of Treet provides six grams of protein, four grams of carbohydrates, 11 grams of fat (17% US Daily Value) including 3.5 grams of saturated fat (18% US Daily Value), and 140 kilocalories (590 kilojoules) of food energy. A serving also contains more than a third of the recommended daily intake of sodium (salt). A 56-gram serving of Treet contains 820 mg of sodium. Treet provides very little in terms of vitamins and minerals (0% vitamin A, 0% vitamin C, 6% calcium, 4% iron).

== See also ==
- Prem
- Potted meat food product
- Spam (food)
