= Spamarama =

Food festival and cook-off in Austin, Texas

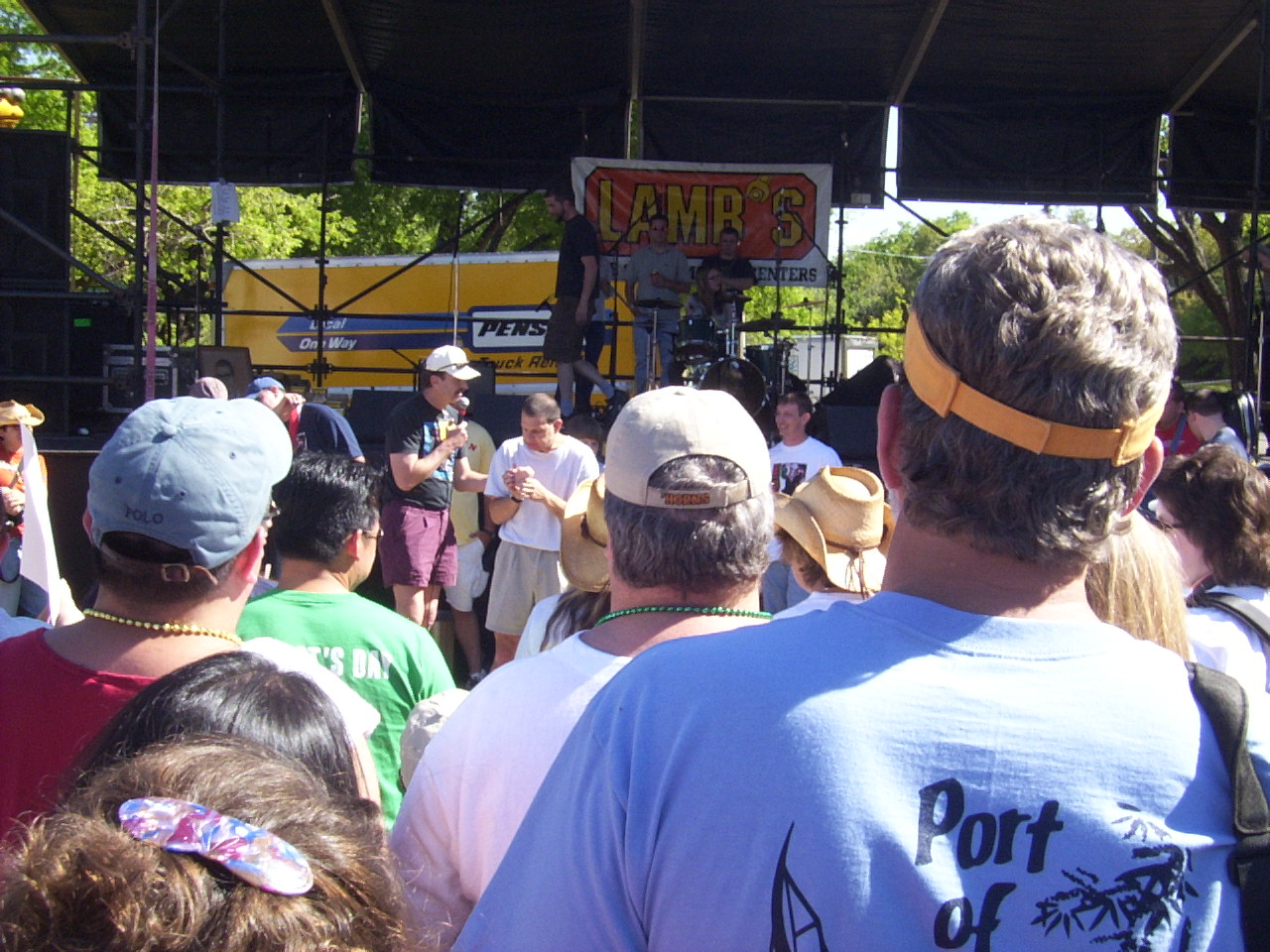
- Spam eating contest at the 2004 Spamarama festival
- Genre: Festival
- Frequency: Annually
- Locations: Austin, Texas
- Country: United States
- Inaugurated: 1978
- Founder: David Arnsberger; Terry Dick

Spamarama (SPAMARAMA) is a long-time annual festival and competitive cookoff held in Austin, Texas, during 1978–2007 and in 2019 and 2022, to celebrate Spam, the branded canned pork product. The festival includes a Spam cook-off, Spam themed competitive activities, and live music.

== Origin ==
The Spamarama began in 1978 as a joke between David Arnsberger and his friend, Dick Terry, who believed there were too many barbecue and chili cook-offs. The frequent contests seemed silly to them and they felt that a real challenge would be to make dishes with Spam. "If you could make Spam edible, that would be a feat," Arnsberger explained. The two friends considered calling the event a "SPAM-Off", but the name quickly became Spamarama.

Arnsberger was one of the frontmen for the Uranium Savages, the Austin parody band, which had a gig already booked on April Fools' Day at Soap Creek Saloon on Bee Cave Road. They piggy-backed their festival idea on to the band's gig and, 300 spectators and 27 entries later, the first Spamarama was a success. Austinites liked the opportunity to compete in events like the pig-shouting contests, to dress in costume, and come up with creative Spam and pig pun-themed dishes. The event was repeated and soon artist Jim Franklin designed Spamarama T-shirts and posters that have since become collector's items.

== Hormel lawsuit ==
Hormel, makers of Spam, sent Jim Franklin a cease-and-desist order for using their brand name. They claimed the Spamarama festival was diluting their product. Hormel eventually located David Arnsberger and worked out a contract with him and Sharon Kincl, which gave them the sole rights to use the Spamarama name in perpetuity royalty free. For the next four years, the Spamarama festival continued. Hormel provided Spam branded items, official T-shirts, ball caps, clocks, and other swag that could be used as prizes, although they did not like the name of the Spam Cram contest.

== Festival's heyday ==
Officially called the Pandemonious Potted Pork Festival, SPAMARAMA was held on a weekend close to April Fool's Day at Auditorium Shores or in Waterloo Park and drew thousands of people to "one of the wackiest festivals in America". The festival was held for several years at the original Soap Creek Saloon, before moving with the saloon to a couple of other locations. Later, it was held at venues such as Scholz Garten, La Zona Rosa, Auditorium Shores, East Sixth Street, the Cedar Door, and Waterloo Park (2006, 2007). The event drew thousands to Auditorium Shores (now Vic Mathias Shores) with Spam cook-offs and the Spamalympics. It peaked in 1998 with more than 14,000 people attending. That same year, Arnsberger published a Spamarama cookbook.

When Arnesberger and Kincl left Austin for Boulder, Colorado, the contract with Hormel went with them. Arnsberger attempted to hold Spamarama festivals in Colorado and Dallas, but these met with little success. Upon returning to Austin in 2005, the festival continued, but by 2007, it was shrinking. Healthy eating was becoming popular and the recession was approaching. Until the 2019 revival, the final festival was held in 2007 at Waterloo Park. The Austin Chronicle reported: "Record-breaking cold couldn’t stop the athletes from impressing the crowds with their canned-meat cramming skills."

The Smithsonian documented the 2007 Spamarama in film.

== Revival 2019 ==
After a 12-year hiatus, Spamarama returned to Austin on July 6, 2019. Founder David Arnsberger teamed up with Josh Bumb, co-owner of the south Austin Moontower Saloon, to revive the unique festival. Hundreds came to the Moontower Saloon in South Austin to honor the canned meat and experience the creativity, athletic competition and live music.

The next year saw the COVID-19 pandemic cause Spamarama to go on hiatus until the 2022 event.

== Cook-off ==
Chef SPAM (John L. Myers) has won more Spamarama awards than any entrant. He was responsible for the creation of the Professional Division, and the coveted "Spamericas Cup". In addition, prizes in both the open and professional divisions were best and worst taste, and showmanship.

Cooking entries have included various flavors of SPAM ice cream, Moo Goo Gai SPAM, GuacaSPAMole, chicken-fried SPAM, SPAMguini, and SPAMalama Ding Dong, a concoction made with the pink colored meat, whipped cream, and chocolate. Other entries have included NutSpittle (Spam with peanut brittle), Spam ramen, and Spam chili.

Judges of the 2019 competition included Travis County Commissioner Brigid Shea, columnist Jim Hightower, TV personality Jim Swift, and South by Southwest co-creator Nick Barbaro. Past event judges included former city council member Max Nofziger, Bob Cole, Joyce and Mel and Mary Vance, John Kelso, Eddie Wilson, David Spooner, Margaret Moser, Liz Carpenter, Paul Prudhomme, and John Myers.

== Spamalympics ==
Spamalympics are other competitions held in addition to the cook-off competition, that test contestants’ skills eating and handling Spam. The core Spamalympic events are the Spam Toss and the Spam eating contest. The latter was called the Spam Cram in the past and took the form of the 'Spamburger eating contest' in 2019. The first person to finish eating the contents of an entire 12-ounce can of Spam wins. In the 'Spam Toss', two-person teams toss Spam from a 12-ounce can to each other. The team that throws it the farthest without dropping the Spam wins.

Other events have included the SPAM carving display involving themes based on current events, body parts, or animals such as the SPAMagator, the SPAM calling contest, the SPAM facial, and the Tug of War across a pit filled with SPAM jelly.
