= Spam Jam =

Annual festival celebrating the popular meat product Spam

Coordinates: 21.2781°N 157.8277°W

SPAM Jam (formerly known as Cedar River days) is a yearly festival of the popular meat product Spam. It was held in Austin, Minnesota, where Hormel Foods produces the meat.

The festival spanned from July 1 to 7 and includes fireworks, parades, games, a carnival, and of course, the mysterious meat itself. Each year, those who entered the city during the festivities were likely to see copious amounts of blue and yellow (the colors of the packaging), and myriad dancing men and women in large SPAM can costumes.

The 2005 event hosted such guests as Bill Nye the Science Guy, Kurtwood Smith, Jerry Turner the auditor and Jim Belushi. Highlighting the 2007 event is the second annual SPAM Fritters eating competition, with 2006 Champion David "Processed Meat Paws" Stauber returning to defend his title mark of 856 fritters (87.1 lb or 39.5 kg).

== Hawaii ==
Spam Jam is currently celebrated annually in Honolulu, Hawaii during the last week of April where it is quickly becoming one of the state's most popular festivals because of its great food and entertainment in a family-friendly atmosphere. Local residents and visitors alike have made this an annual tradition. In 2009, an estimated 20,000 people attended the event.

Kalakaua Avenue, the main street in Waikiki, is closed to car traffic during the event, and various entertainment stages are set up on the street. Between the stages, several of Honolulu's finest restaurants will be serving up Spam in many different ways. Several merchandise tents sell Spam-themed items including T-shirts, shorts, sport balls, and slippers. A variety of Hawaiian craft booths will also be set up on the street.

Introduced in 1937 by Hormel Foods, more Spam is consumed per person in Hawaii than in any other state in the United States. Almost seven million cans of Spam are eaten every year in Hawaii.
