= Nob Hill Food Carts =

Food cart pod in Portland, Oregon, U.S.

- Logo
- Opened: 2019
- Location: Portland, Oregon, U.S.
- Location within Portland, Oregon
- Coordinates: 45°32′10.3″N 122°42′0.5″W

Nob Hill Food Carts is a food cart pod in Portland, Oregon, United States. The pod opened in northwest Portland's Northwest District in 2019.

== Description and history ==
In August 2019, Gregg Opsahl confirmed plans to open a 14-cart pod in November. Businesses have included:

- Bajala
- Bing Mi
- Drunken Noodle
- Farmer and the Beast
- La Tehuana, or Tehuana Oaxacan Cuisine
- The Pour House
- Ramen Ippo
- Rollin' Fresh
- Rose City Pasta
- Your Side Chicks
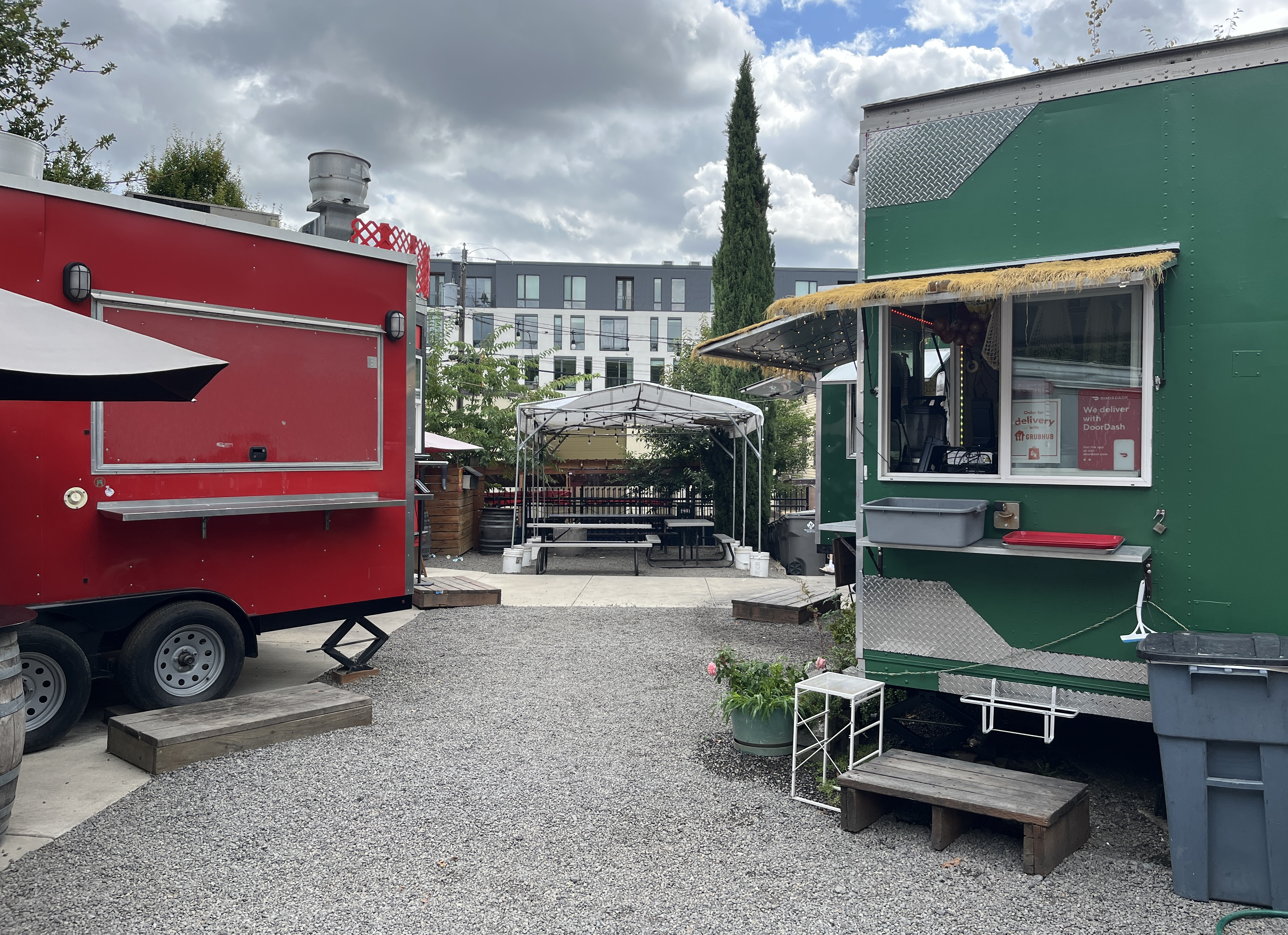
The pod in 2025

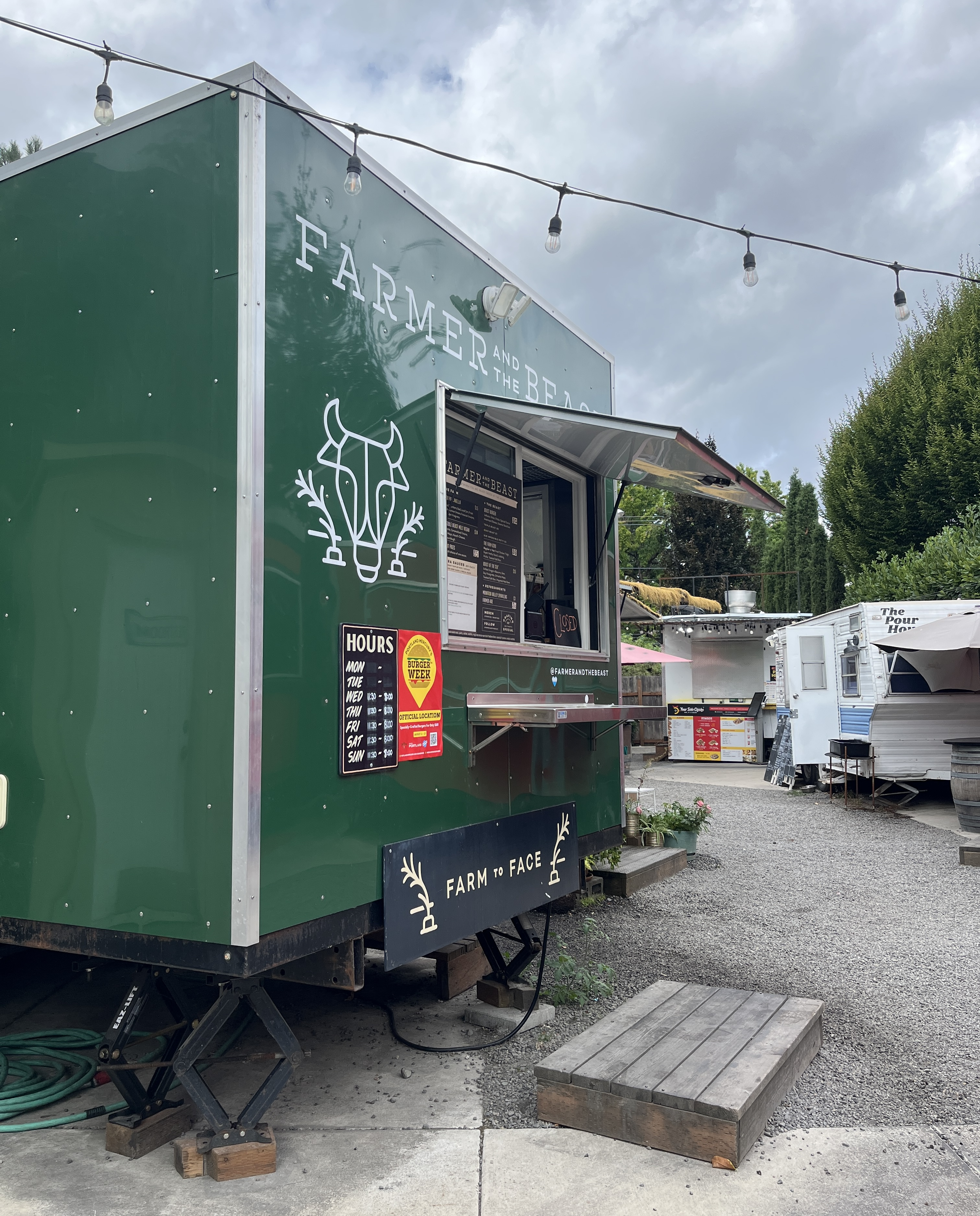
Farmer and the Beast, 2025

== Reception ==
In 2021, Suzette Smith of the Portland Mercury said the carts "have grown into a great little spot to have a beer and enjoy an outdoor treat" and wrote, "Situated as they are, between neighborhood houses, it's hard to imagine Nob pod will ever be the late night, street food destination of our dreams."
