= Expensify =

American expense management company

Expensify, Inc.

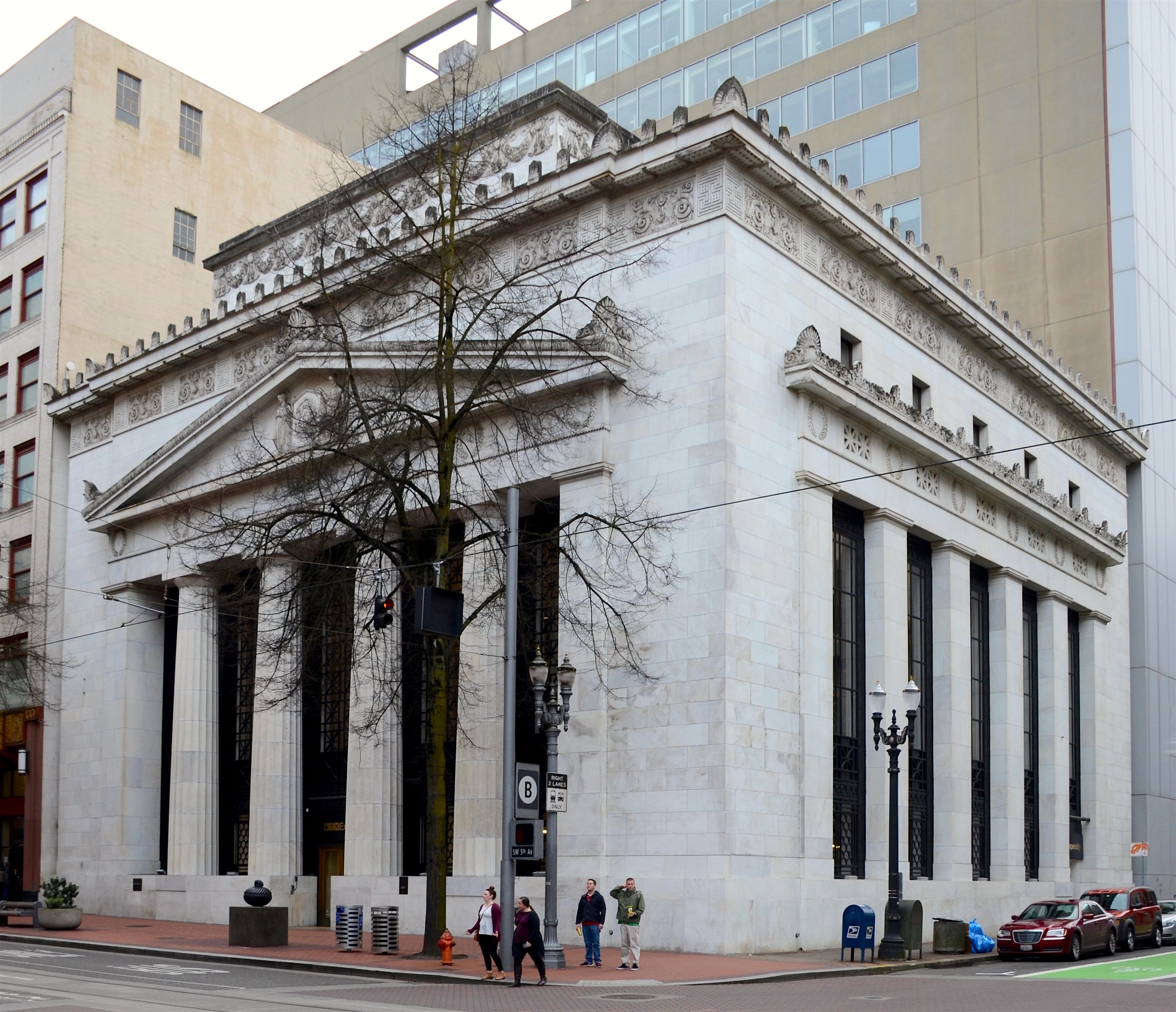
- Expensify's headquarters, the former First National Bank Building, in Portland, Oregon
- Type: Public
- Traded as: Nasdaq: EXFY
- ISIN: US30219Q1067
- Industry: Expense management software
- Founded: 2008; 18 years ago
- Founder: David Barrett
- Headquarters: Portland, Oregon, U.S.
- Key people: David Barrett (CEO); Ryan Schaffer (CFO); Anu Muralidharan (COO)
- Revenue: ▲US$169 million (2022)
- Operating income: ▼US$−15 million (2022)
- Net income: ▼US$−27 million (2022)
- Total assets: ▲US$210 million (2022)
- Total equity: ▲US$97 million (2022)
- Number of employees: 138 (December 2022)
- Subsidiaries: Expensify Ventures
- Website: expensify.com

Expensify, Inc. is an American software company that develops an expense management system for personal and business use. Expensify also offers a business credit card called the Expensify Card.

== History ==
Expensify was founded in 2008 by current CEO David Barrett. Barrett, a native of Saginaw, Michigan, and a graduate of the University of Michigan, began programming at the age of six. He was involved in numerous tech companies prior to Expensify, including Red Swoosh.

The company has completed several rounds of venture capital funding, raising $1 million in 2009, $5.7 million in 2010, $3.5 million in 2014, and $17 million in 2015.

The company, which expanded its operation in Michigan in 2014, partnered with Gogebic Community College to offer scholarships to students in the area. In July 2015, CEO David Barrett addressed the United States Congress on behalf of the app industry, speaking to a House, Health, and Technology subcommittee.

In November 2017, the company faced allegations of exposing some customers' personal information to contractors manually entering receipts through Amazon's Mechanical Turk service. Expensify acknowledged that a bug allowed fewer than 200 receipts to be visible to certain company contractors using Mechanical Turk to test a new feature under development. The company halted the test.

The company went public on 11 November 2021 under the ticker EXFY. The company's stock has decreased more than 95% since its IPO.

In 2023, Expensify funded an update and renovation of Portland's oldest food cart pod, located next to their Portland headquarters. It was renamed the Midtown Beer Garden.

== Products ==
Expensify has developed a reporting expense mobile and web application that is available in the Apple and Android marketplaces.

Expensify allows users to download expense reports based on user transactions.

In June 2025, it was announced they would be expanding their corporate card product to Canada.

== Expensify Ventures ==
Expensify launched a venture capital arm, Expensify Ventures, as part of a $17 million round of funding the company received in early 2015. Expensify Ventures makes strategic investments in early-stage travel, payments, and finance start-ups.

== Political activism ==
On 22 October 2020, in a highly controversial letter, CEO David Barrett emailed all Expensify customers and non-customers on Expensify's marketing list worldwide, urging them to vote for U.S. presidential candidate Joe Biden.
