= Tokyo Sando =

Restaurant in Portland, Oregon, U.S.

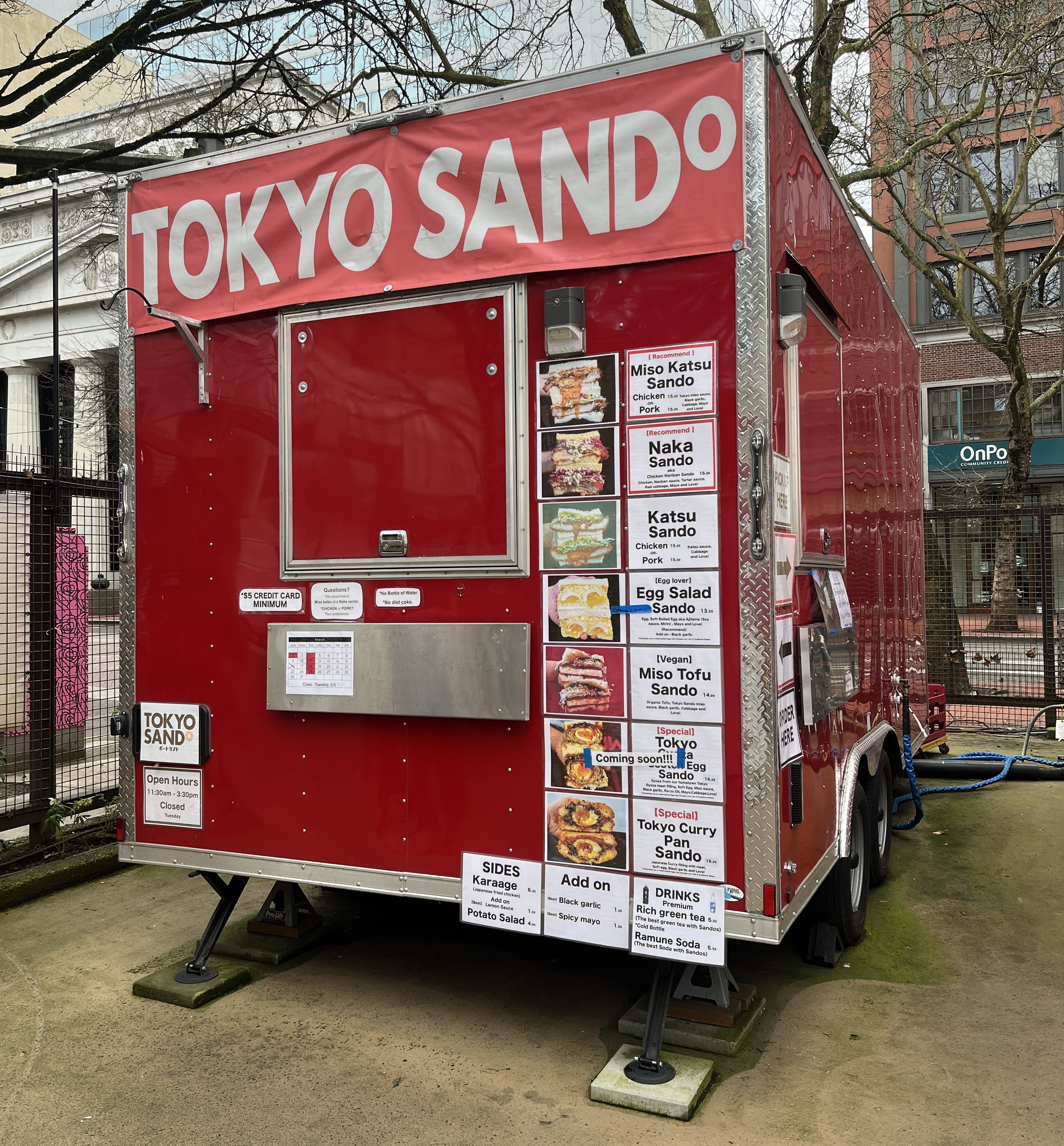
- The food cart at Midtown Beer Garden, 2025
- Interactive map of Tokyo Sando

Restaurant information
- Established: February 2, 2020
- Owner: Taiki Nakajima
- Previous owner: Andrea McCullough (formerly Nakajima)
- Location: 431 Southwest Harvey Milk Street, Portland, Multnomah, Oregon, 97204, United States
- Coordinates: 45.5208°N 122.6763°W
- Website: tokyosando.com

Tokyo Sando is a restaurant in Portland, Oregon. Spouses Taiki Nakajima and Andrea Nakajima began operating the food cart from the Portland State University campus in downtown Portland in February 2020, just prior to the arrival of the COVID-19 pandemic. The business later relocated to 2nd Avenue and Stark Street. In 2023, the owners announced plans to close permanently due to increases food costs and declining revenue. However, in 2024, Tokyo Sando re-opened in the Southwest 5th Avenue food cart pod. The business has garnered a positive reception.

== Description ==
Tokyo Sando serves Japanese-style sandwiches from a food cart in downtown Portland's Southwest 5th Avenue food cart pod. Willamette Week has described the food as a fusion of Japanese and Pacific Northwest cuisine. Sandwiches use Japanese milk bread; varieties include katsu chicken or pork with cabbage and tonkatsu sauce, as well as egg salad with dijon mustard, green onion, Kewpie, and a house-made mayonnaise.

== History ==
Owners and spouses Taiki Nakajima and Andrea Nakajima opened Tokyo Sando on February 2, 2020, initially operating from a food cart at the intersection of Southwest 4th Avenue and Hall Street on the Portland State University campus in downtown Portland. Like many businesses, Tokyo Sando experienced hardships during the COVID-19 pandemic. By May 2021, Tokyo Sando was operating at 2nd Avenue and Stark Street (also known as Harvey Milk Street). Cash and credit card machines were stolen from the cart in July. According to Oregon Public Broadcasting (OPB), "Despite the challenges posed by the COVID-19 pandemic, the food truck developed a sizable clientele, evident in its following of more than 21,000 accounts on Instagram and an overall Yelp rating of 4.5 based on 300-plus reviews." Andrea Nakajima had also decided to leave the business during the summer of 2021.

In November 2023, the owners announced plans to close permanently on December 17. The couple wrote: "We struggled to keep the business operating in the challenging times, but tried to stay open 7 days a week, because we didn't know what else to do, other than keep open the cart. Now, due to the condition of what Portland has become, we don't know why we're making Japanese food in Portland." Taiki Nakajima cited increased food costs and declining revenue as reasons for the closure. He shared plans take an extended break in Japan and possibly return.

In January 2024, Taiki Nakajima teased the possible return to Portland on social media. Tokyo Sando began operating from the Southwest 5th Avenue food cart pod (rebranded Midtown Beer Garden) in February. In a statement, the cart's owners said, "We think we want to fall in love with the city of Portland again."

== Reception ==
In 2021, during the pandemic, Andrea Damewood included the miso pork katsu sandwich in Willamette Week's list of five "makeshift picnics perfect for a Portland summer". Jean Chen Smith recommended Tokyo Sando in SFGate's 2023 guide to Portland. Following the 2023 closure announcement, OPB said the business was "leaving a shokupan-shaped hole in Portland's heart". Tokyo Sando was included in Eater Portland's 2025 overview of the city's best food carts.

== See also ==
- History of Japanese Americans in Portland, Oregon
- List of Japanese restaurants
