= Midtown Beer Garden =

Food carts in Portland, Oregon, U.S.

- Southwest 5th Avenue food cart pod
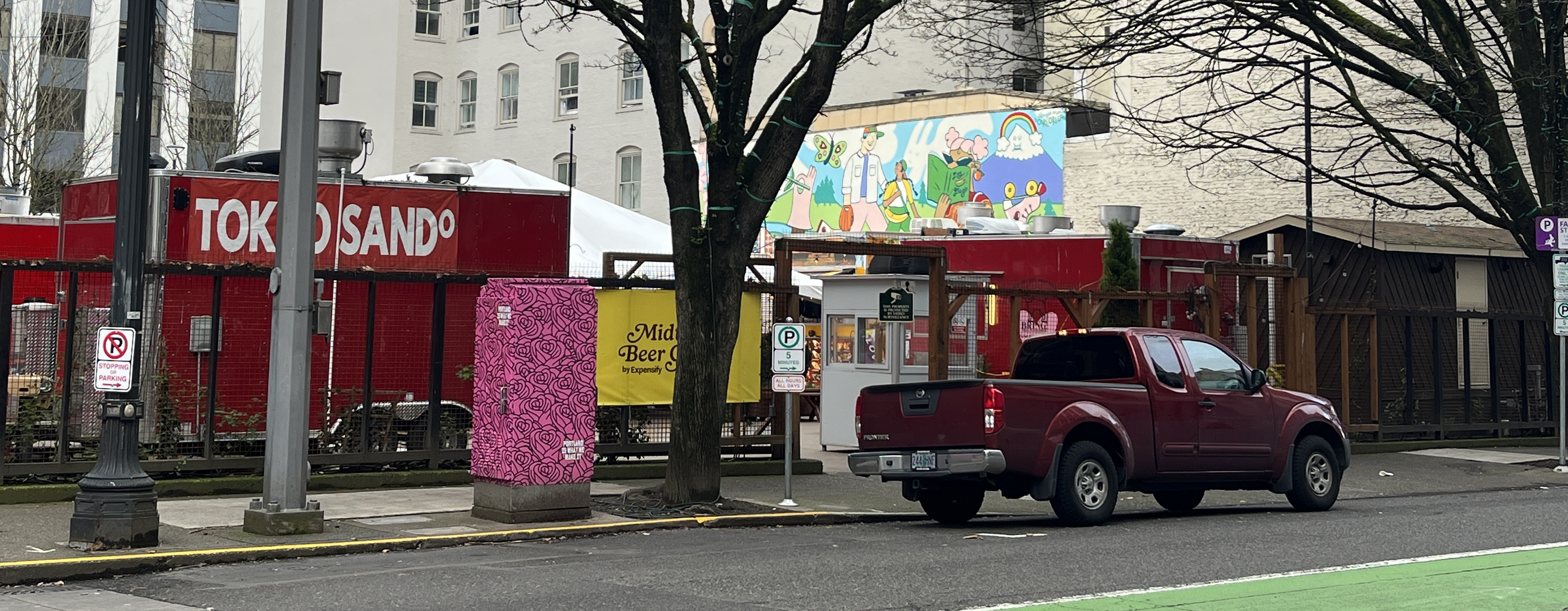
- View of the food cart pod from across the street, 2025
- Opened: Early 1980s
- Location: Portland, Oregon, U.S.
- Location within Portland, Oregon
- Coordinates: 45.5211°N 122.6761°W

The Midtown Beer Garden (formerly known as the Southwest 5th Avenue food cart pod) is a food cart pod in Portland, Oregon, United States. The pod is the city's oldest, operating since the early 1980s. Following an update and renovation in 2023, the pod became known as Midtown Beer Garden. Notable tenants include Bing Mi, Stretch the Noodle, and Tokyo Sando.

== Description and history ==
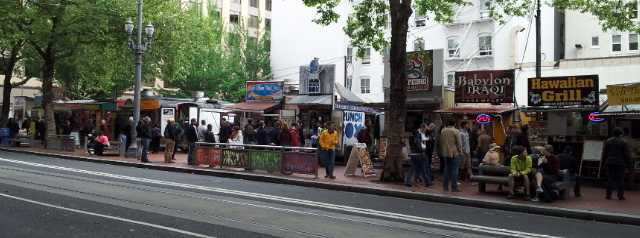
The food cart pod in 2013

The pod has operated in downtown Portland, along Southwest Fifth Avenue between Harvey Milk (Stark) Street and Oak Street, since the early 1980s. It is considered the city's oldest food cart pod. Food & Wine has said the pod "specializes in Korean tacos, Mexican, and Egyptian cuisine".

The site of the pod has been considered for development. In 2016, Matthew Korfhage of Willamette Week reported, "The bustling pods at Southwest 5th Avenue and Stark Street, Southwest 2nd Avenue and Stark Street and Southwest 3rd Avenue and Oak Street are on the list of properties announced for future development by Greg Goodman, co-president of the Downtown Development Group and scion to one of Portland's most powerful property-owning families."

The pod has been vandalized. In 2022, an explosion at one cart damaged nearby buildings.

In May 2023, an update and renovation funded by Expensify in collaboration with the restaurant group ChefStable was announced. According to Eater Portland, the pod has "room for 30 carts, seating for more than 300 people, a bar cart with beer on tap, and a stage for concerts and events". The pod was rebranded as Midtown Beer Garden. The re-opening was held on August 20.

In July 2026, the pod hosted "Play with Pride" in conjunction with the city's annual Pride celebrations. The family-friendly event featured drag performers.

=== Businesses ===
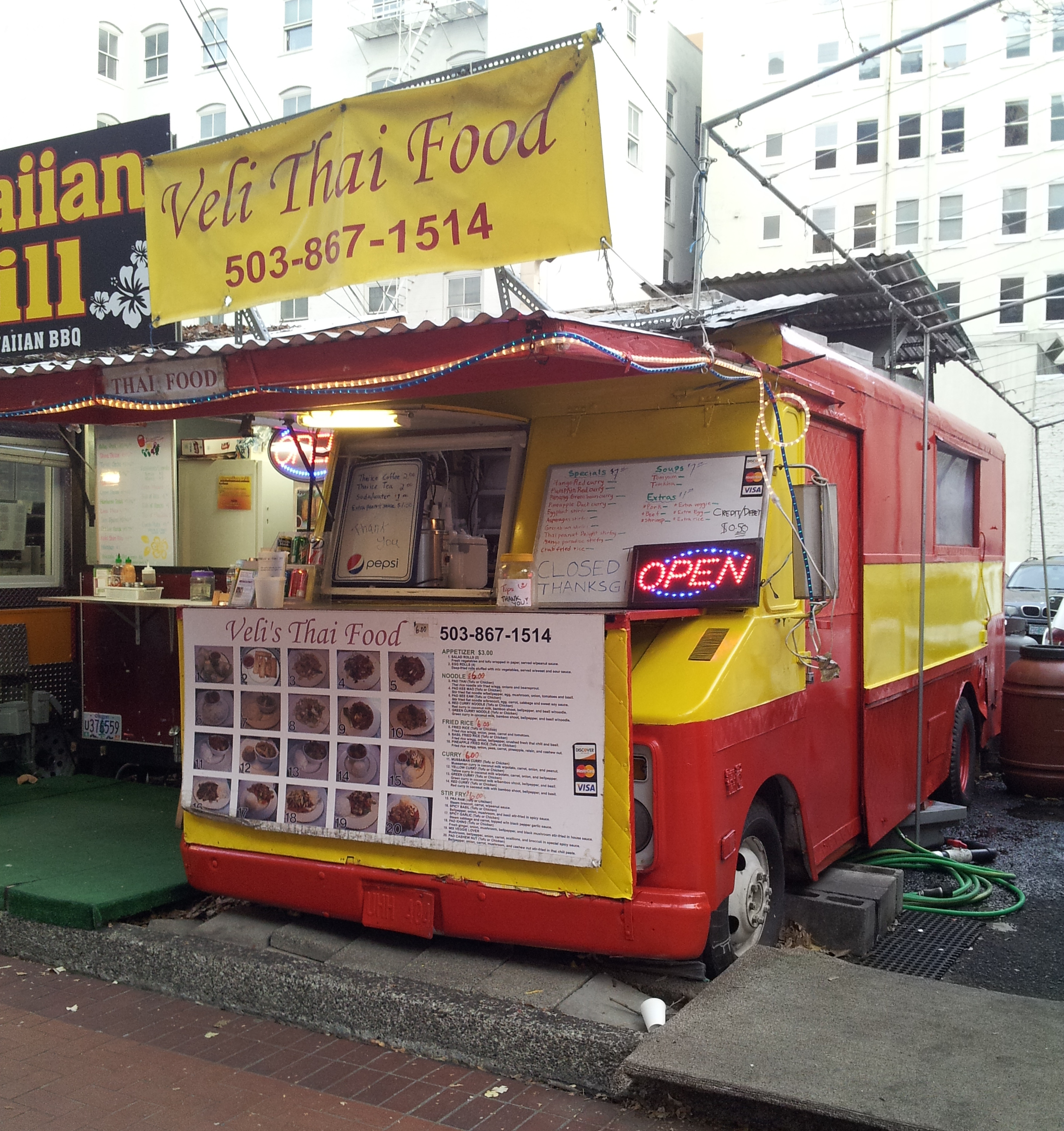
Veli's Thai Food, 2013

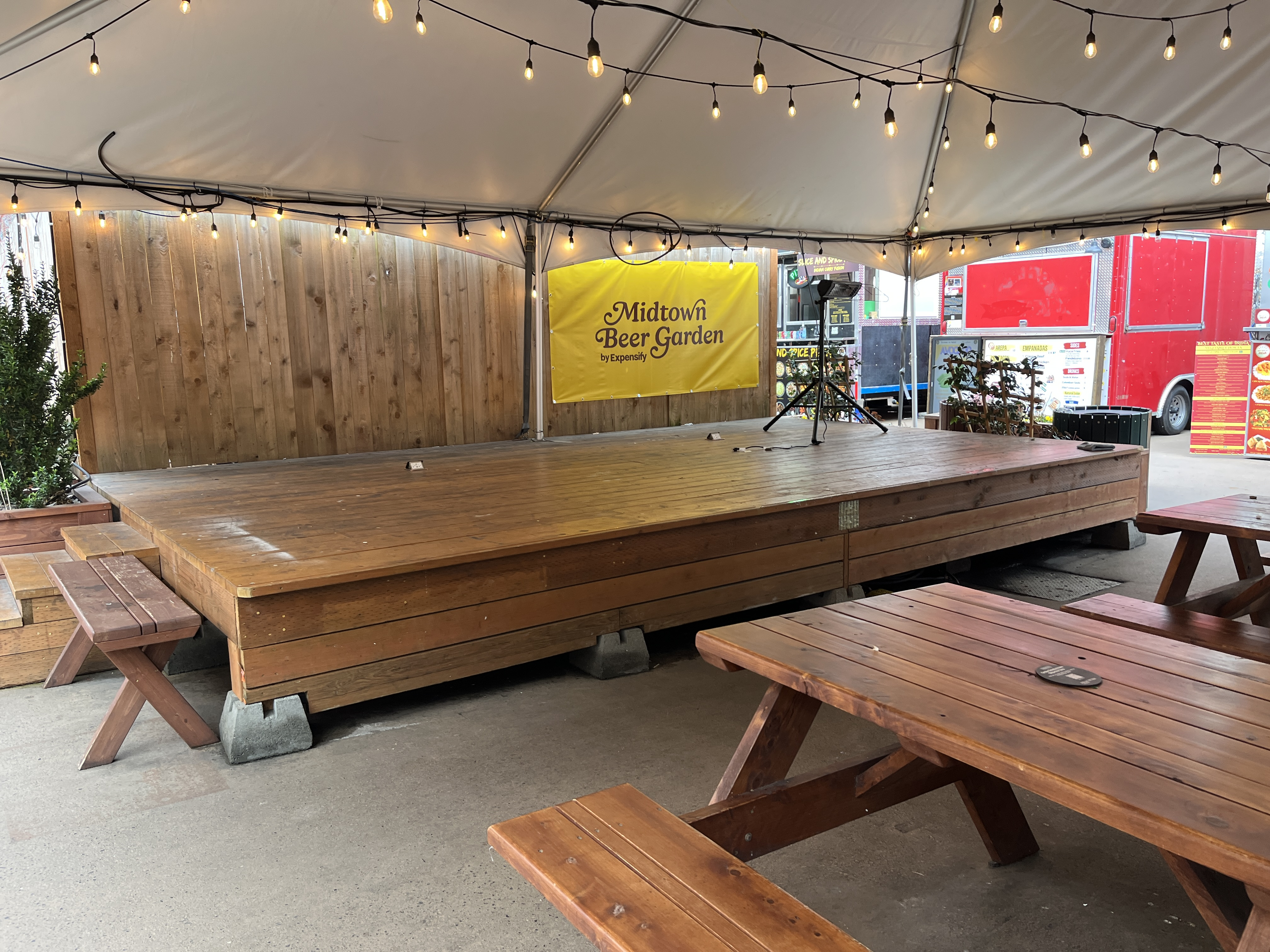
Covered seating at Midtown Beer Garden, 2025

Businesses which operated in the pod prior to the 2023 rebrand include:

- Alibaba Takeaway
- Gyro Place
- Khob Khun Thai Food
- Korean Twist
- La Jarochita, part of a small chain of Mexican restaurants, has served burritos, breakfast plates, sopes, huaraches, and tamales. Nick Zukin of Willamette Week called La Jarochita "the best Mexican food cart downtown" in 2016. Samantha Bakall included the business in The Oregonian's 2017 list of the ten best food carts in downtown Portland.
- Mawj Babylon Cuisine
- Mr. Taco
- Ocean Aloha
- Small Pharaoh's Falafel
- Tito's Burritos

Businesses that have operated at Midtown Beer Garden include:

- Bing Mi
- Bop Cha, Eat Korean Food
- El Pilon
- Monster Mac
- Shawarma Station
- Stretch the Noodle
- Tokyo Sando

== Reception ==
In 2023, in response to Food & Wine naming Portland "the best food truck city in America", Michael Russell of The Oregonian wrote, "No argument there, though I don't necessarily recommend following the magazine's advice about where to start (Stretch the Noodle is great, but the Third and Fifth Avenue carts downtown have seen better days)."
