= Farmer and the Beast =

Restaurant chain in the U.S. state of Oregon

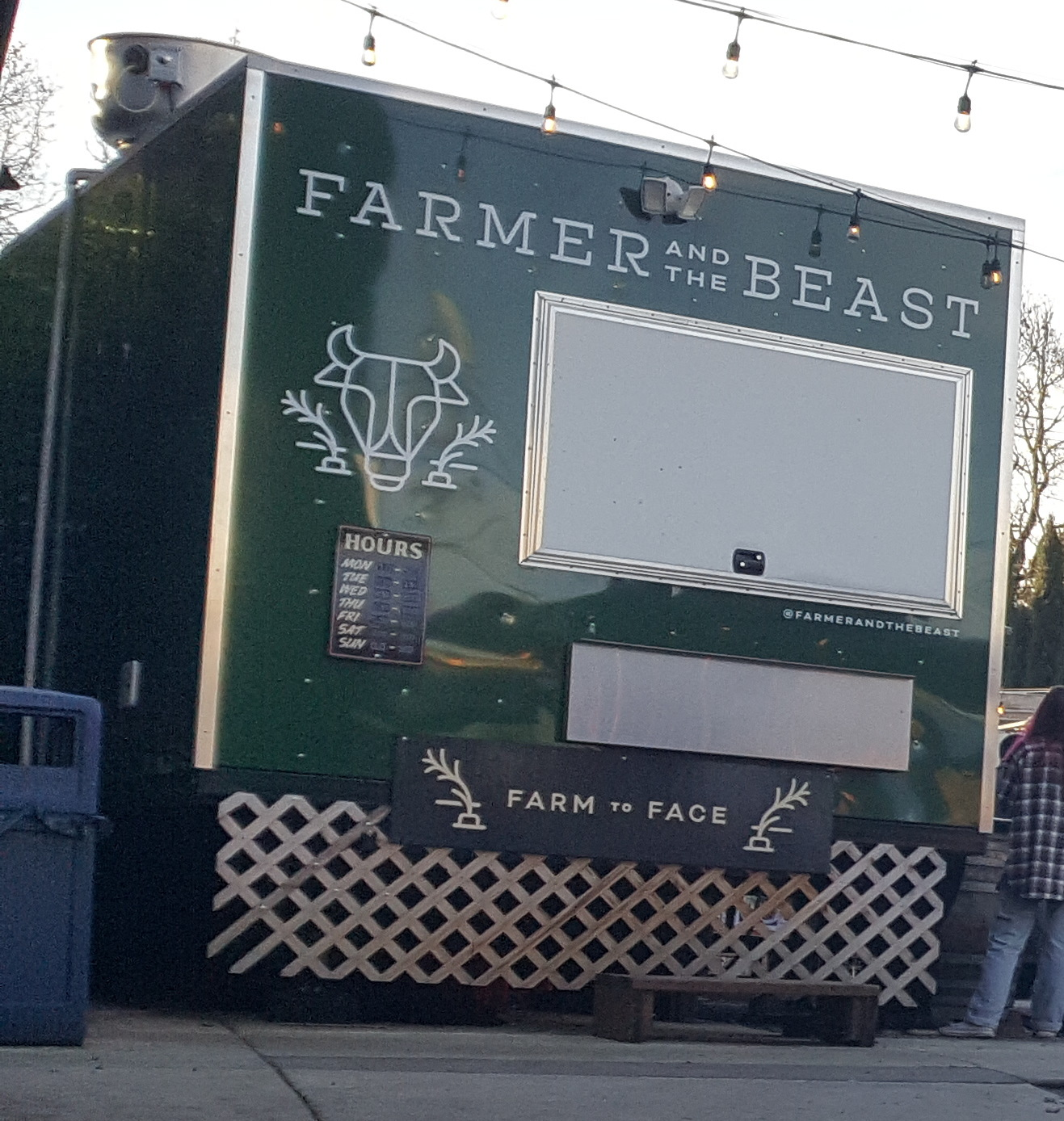
- The food cart at Nob Hill Food Carts in Portland, Oregon, 2022
- Interactive map of Farmer and the Beast

Restaurant information
- Chef: Jeff Larson; Schuyler Wallace
- Location: Portland; Beaverton, Oregon, United States
- Coordinates: 45.5361°N 122.6999°W

Farmer and the Beast is a restaurant based in the Portland metropolitan area, in the United States. The original food cart operates at the Nob Hill Food Carts in northwest Portland's Northwest District and a second location is at the Breakside Beer Garden in Beaverton. Among menu options are a smash burger, a fish sandwich with albacore, and salads. The restaurant has garnered a positive reception, especially for its smash burger and salad options.

== Description ==
The restaurant Farmer and the Beast operates food carts in the Oregon cities of Portland and Beaverton. The menu includes a smash burger with American cheese, lettuce, onion, pickles, and a sauce similar to Thousand Island dressing, and a fish sandwich with albacore, coleslaw, and mayonnaise on a brioche bun. One of the salads has avocado, cucumbers, edible flowers, herbs, nuts, parched wheat, watermelon, and a vinaigrette. The restaurant has also served a sandwich with asparagus and a salad with arugula, grapefruit, ricotta, rye croutons, snap peas, and a lemon vinaigrette. A vegan burger is also available.

== History ==
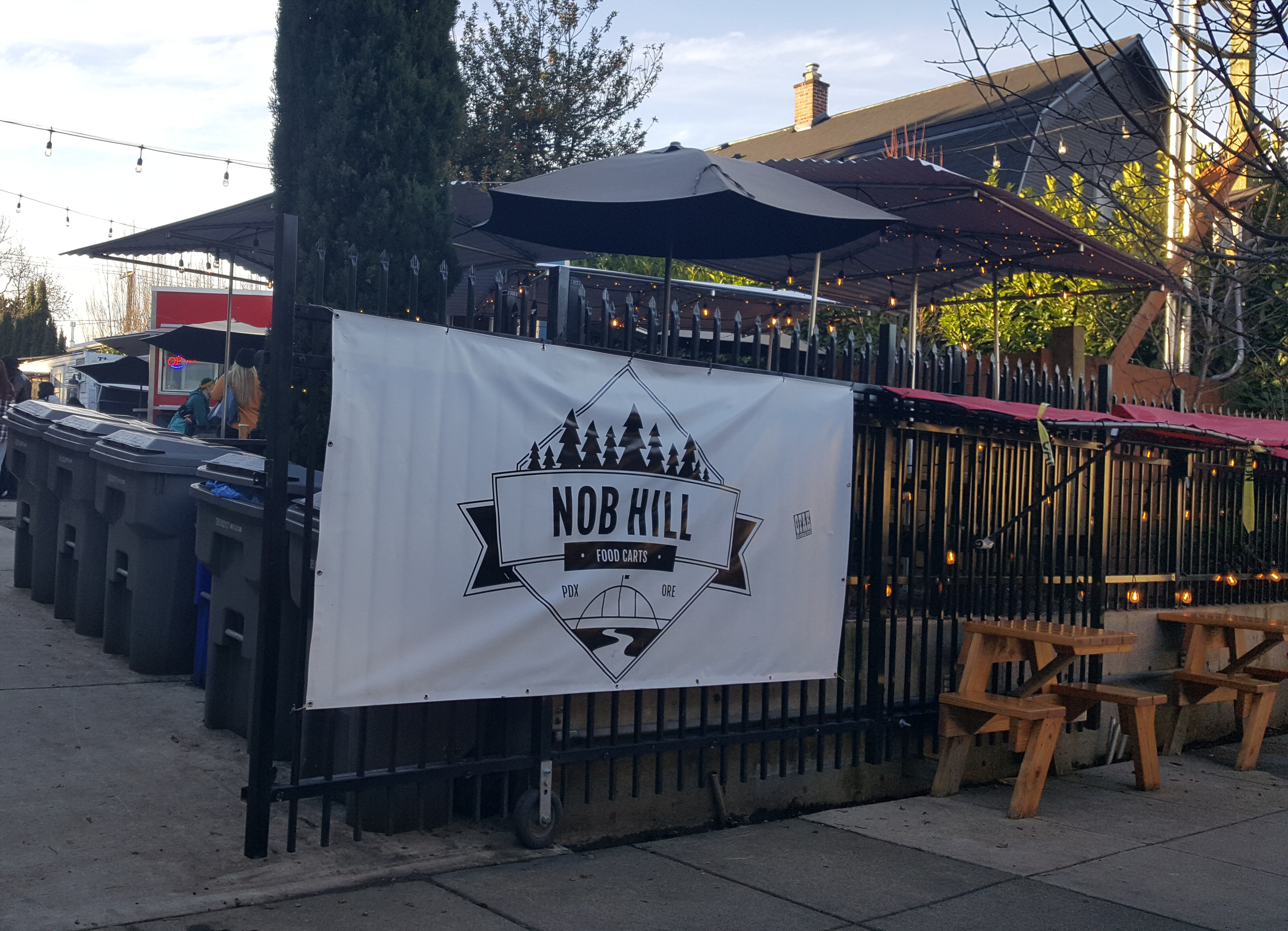
In Portland, the food cart operates at the Nob Hill Food Carts (pictured in 2022) in northwest Portland's Northwest District.

Jeff Larson and Schuyler Wallace are chefs. In Portland, the food cart operates at the Nob Hill Food Carts in northwest Portland's Northwest District. In 2021, the business announced plans to operate a second food cart at the Breakside Beer Garden in Beaverton.

In 2021, Farmer and the Beast participated in Burger Week, an annual food event organized by the Portland Mercury.

== Reception ==
Michael Russell included Farmer and the Beast in The Oregonian's list of Portland’s 10 best new food carts of 2020. In the newspaper's 2021 overview of five hamburgers "every Portlander should know", he said Farmer and the Beast offered the city's best food cart burger. The business ranked fifth in the newspaper's annual Readers Choice Awards in 2024.

Andrea Damewood included the restaurant's seasonal options in Willamette Week's 2021 overview of the city's eight best salads. Alex France included Farmer and the Beast in Eater Portland's 2023 overview of "quintessential" bars and restaurants in the Slabtown district. Rebecca Rowland included it in the website's 2025 list of the city's best burger and said the smash burger "holds its own among the smash burgers in town, with a flavor reminiscent of a backyard cookout in all of the best ways". Eater Portland also listed it in a 2025 overview of the city's best food carts.

Brooke Jackson-Glidden included it in Portland Monthly's 2025 overviews of the best restaurant chains in Beaverton. The Infatuation's Krista Garcia mentioned it in a 2025 list of Portland's best food carts.
