= Spam fritter =

Slice of Spam fried in batter

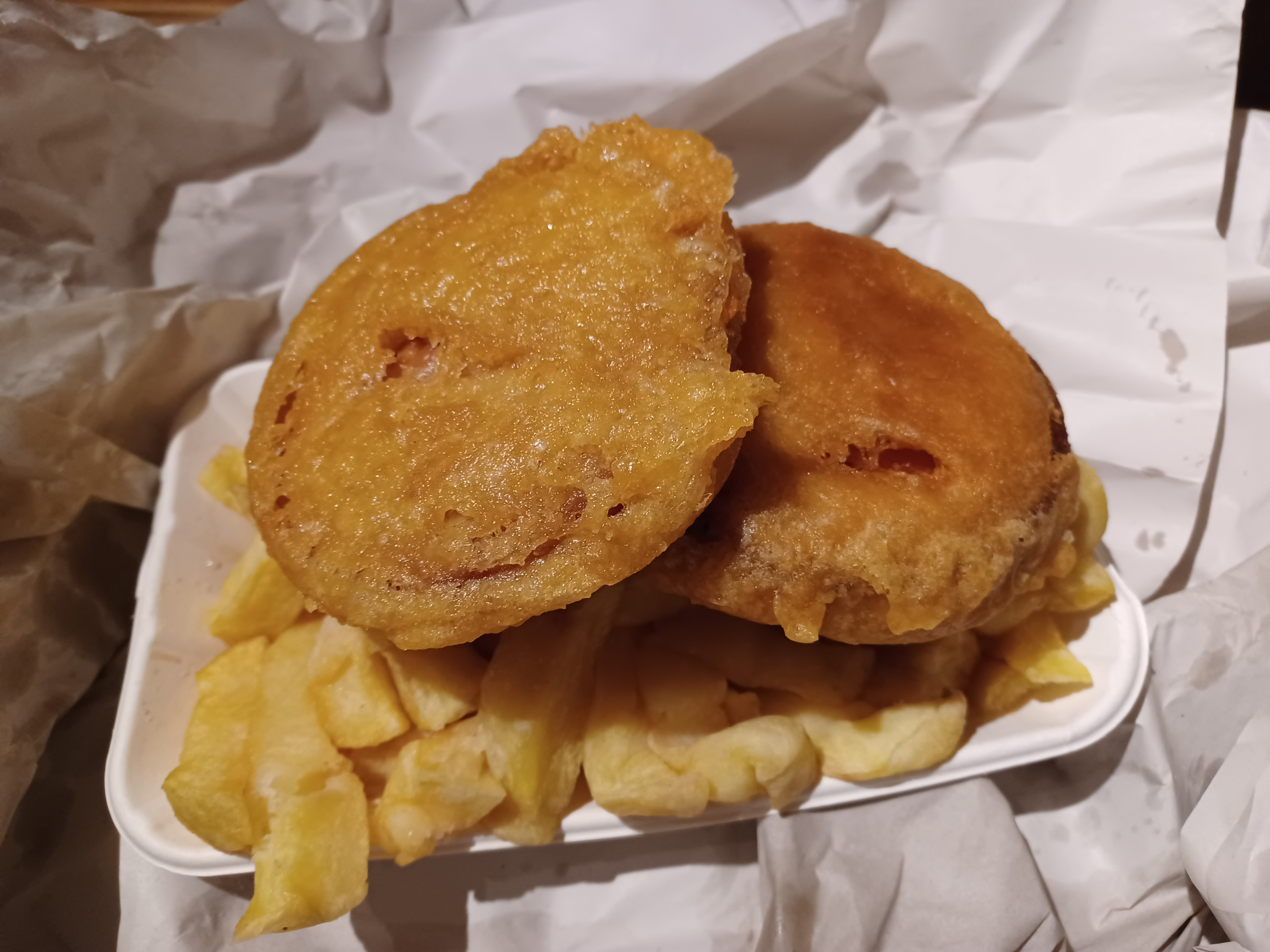
- Spam fritters served with chips
- Place of origin: United Kingdom
- Main ingredients: Spam, batter

A spam fritter is a slice of Spam fried in batter. Commonly eaten with chips and mushy peas, spam fritters are served in fish and chip shops and burger bars in the UK. They were first introduced during World War II due to fish being unavailable. Spam fritters were so associated with the war that in 1995 a government memo relating to the commemoration of the 50-year anniversary of the war ending recommended "spam-fritter frying to get into the wartime spirit".

In 2006, the makers of Spam, Hormel Foods, announced the return of the spam fritter in pre-packaged form.
