= Spam (food) =

Canned pork product

- Brand logo

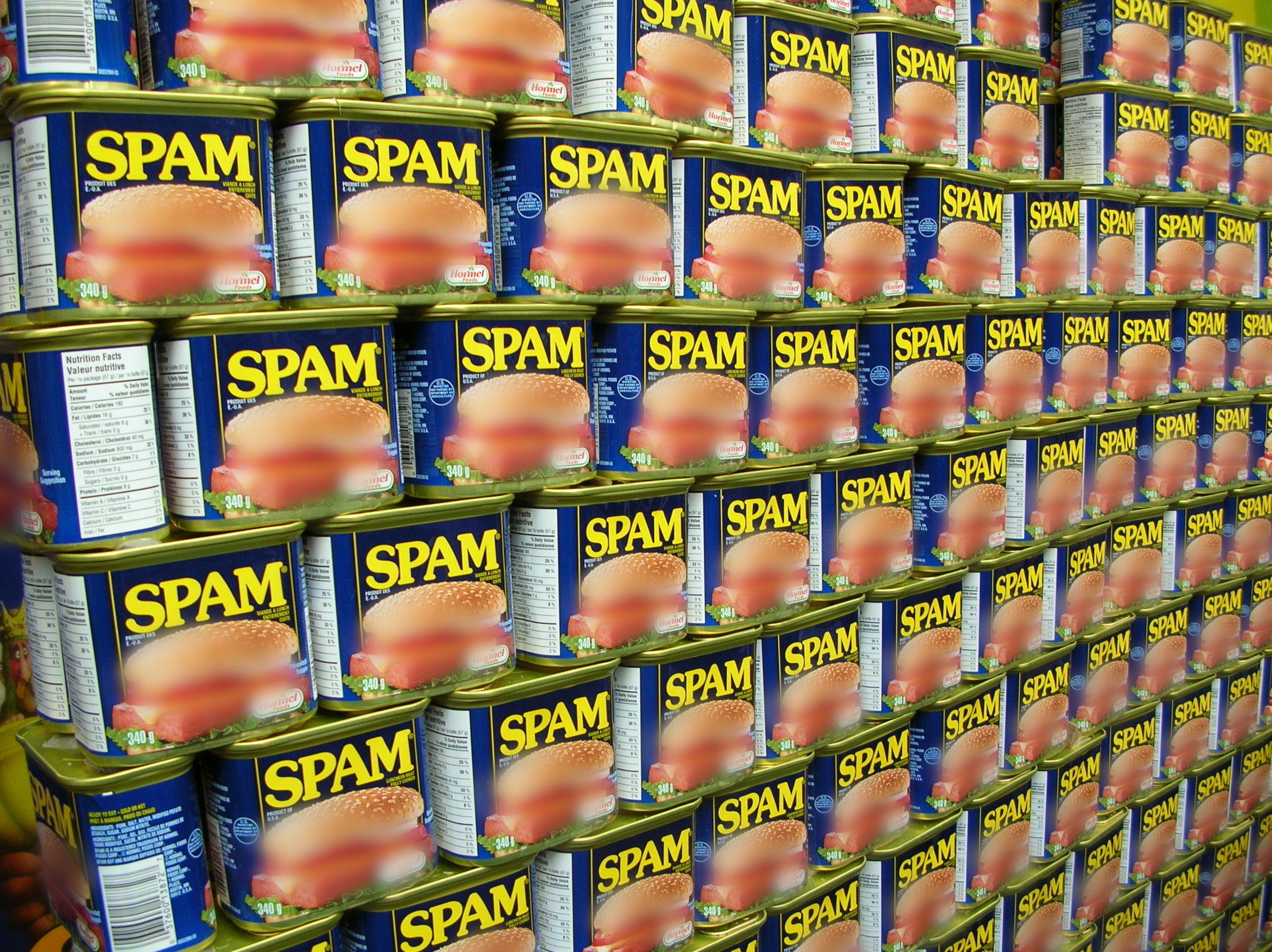
- Stacked cans of Spam Classic
- Product type: Pre-cooked canned meat product
- Current owner: Hormel Foods Corporation
- Produced by: Hormel Foods Corporation
- Country: United States
- Introduced: 1937
- Markets: Worldwide
- Website: www.spam.com

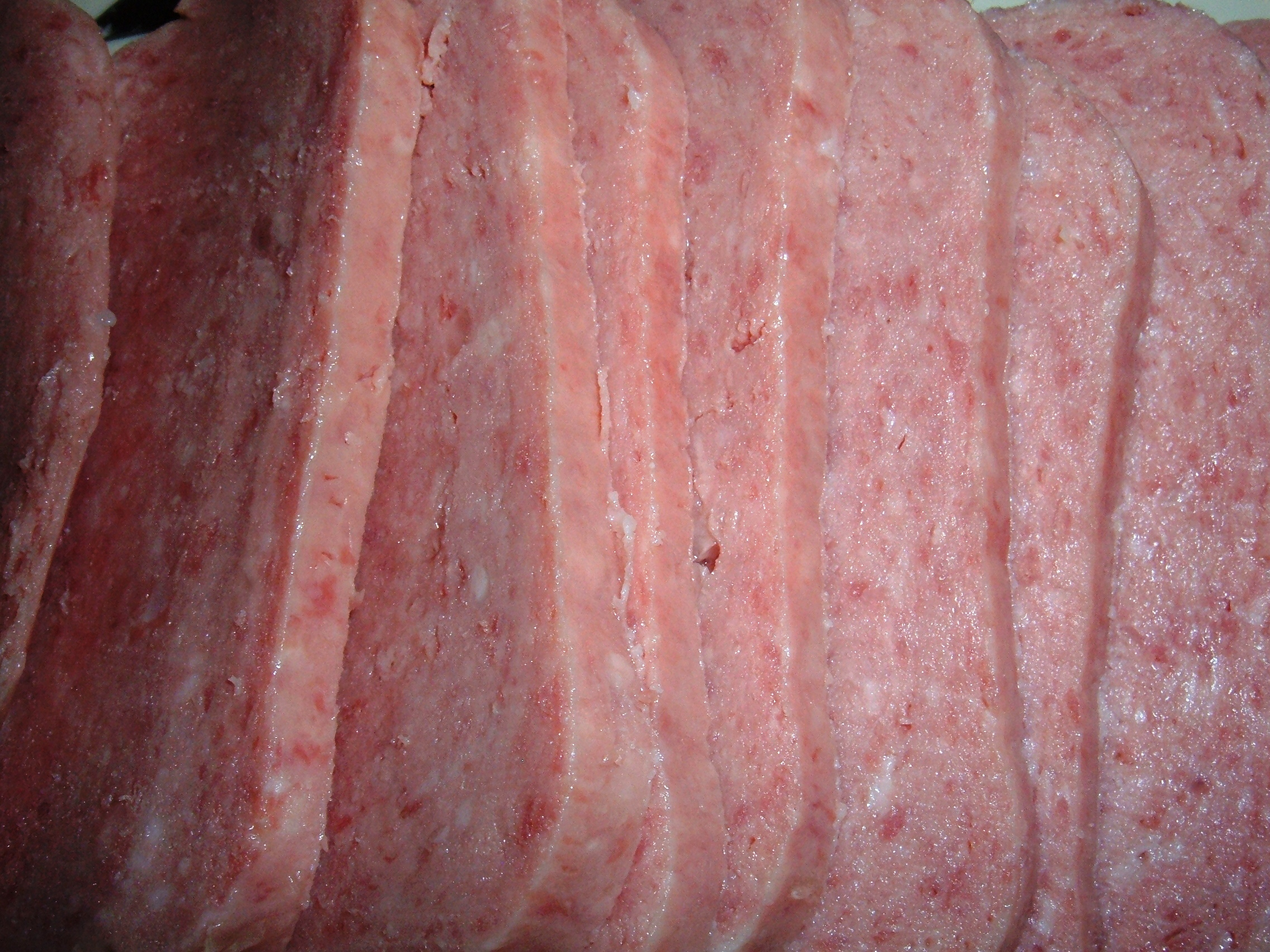
Several slices of Spam

Spam (stylized in all caps) is a brand of lunch meat (processed canned pork and ham) made by Hormel Foods Corporation, an American multinational food processing company. It was introduced in the United States in 1937 and gained popularity worldwide after its use during World War II. As of July 5, 2022, Spam is sold in 48 countries, and trademarked in more than 100 countries, on 6 continents.

Spam's main ingredient is a mixture of pork and ham, with salt, water, modified potato starch (as a binder), sugar, and sodium nitrite (as a preservative). Natural gelatin is formed during cooking in its cans on the production line. It is available in different flavors, some using different meats, as well as in "lite" and lower-sodium versions. Spam is pre-cooked, making it safe to consume straight from the can, but it is often cooked further for taste.

Spam has become part of popular culture, including a Monty Python sketch, which repeated the name many times, leading to its name being used to describe unsolicited electronic messages, especially email. It is occasionally celebrated at festivals such as Spamarama in Austin, Texas.

== History ==
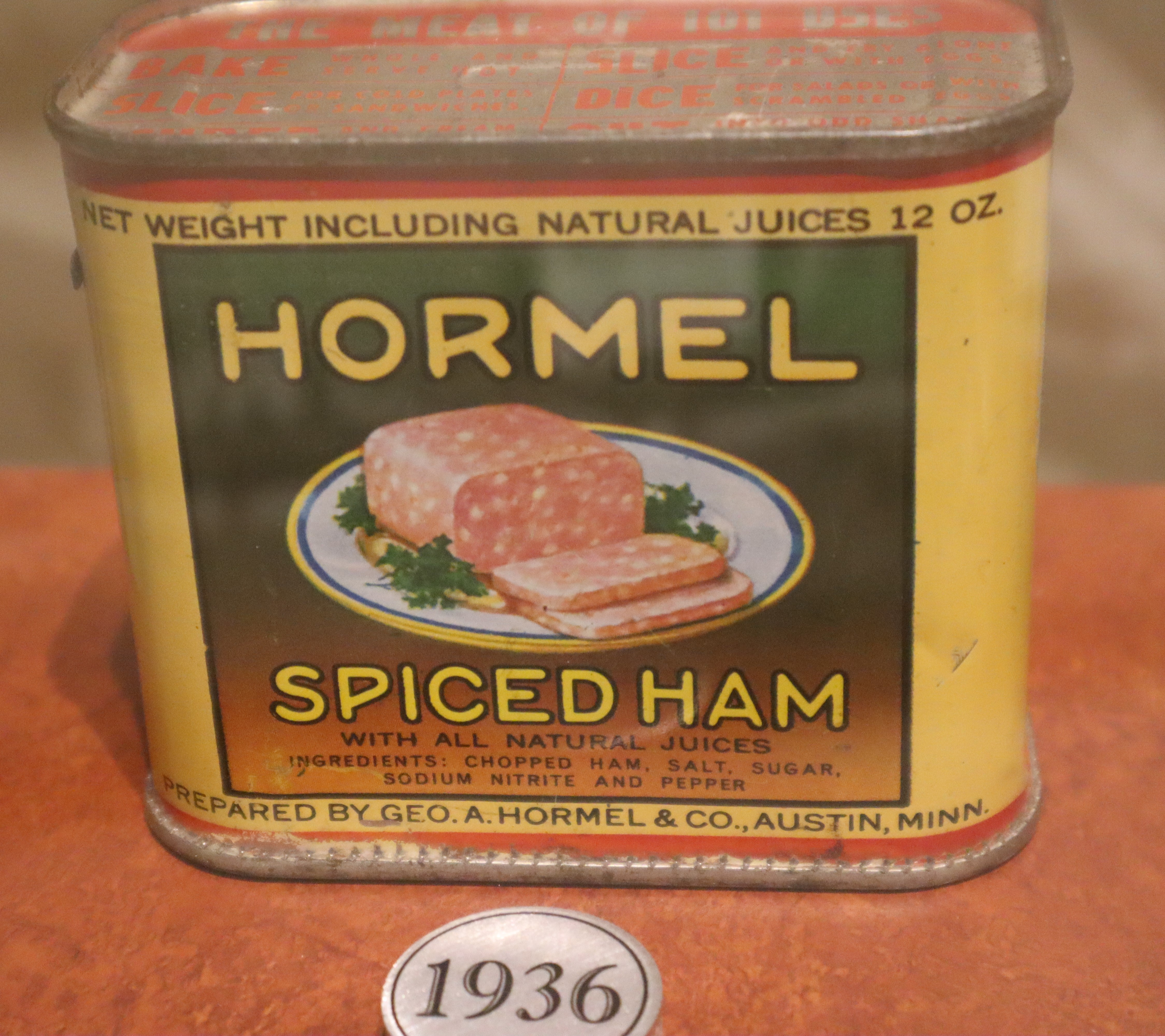
Hormel Spiced Ham, a Spam predecessor from 1936

Hormel introduced Spam on July 5, 1937. The Oxford Encyclopedia of Food and Drink in America states that the product was intended to increase the sale of pork shoulder, a cut which did not sell well. That same year, Ken Daigneau, the brother of a company executive, won a competition to name the new item and received US$100 (equivalent to $2,240 in 2025). Hormel states that the meaning of the name "is known by only a small circle of former Hormel Foods executives", but a popular belief is that the name is a contraction of "spiced ham". It has also been speculated to be an acronym for "shoulder of pork and ham". The official website shows a backronym for "sizzle, pork, and mmm".

The difficulty of delivering fresh meat to the front during World War II saw Spam become a ubiquitous part of the U.S. soldier's diet. It became variously referred to as "ham that didn't pass its physical", "meatloaf without basic training", and "special army meat". Over 150 million pounds (68 kt) of Spam were received by the military before the war's end. However, several troops grew tired of the product. They expressed their frustrations in written letters to Jay Hormel, the president of the company, about the presence of Spam at every meal. Despite this disparagement, throughout the war, countries ravaged by the conflict and faced with strict food rations came to appreciate Spam.

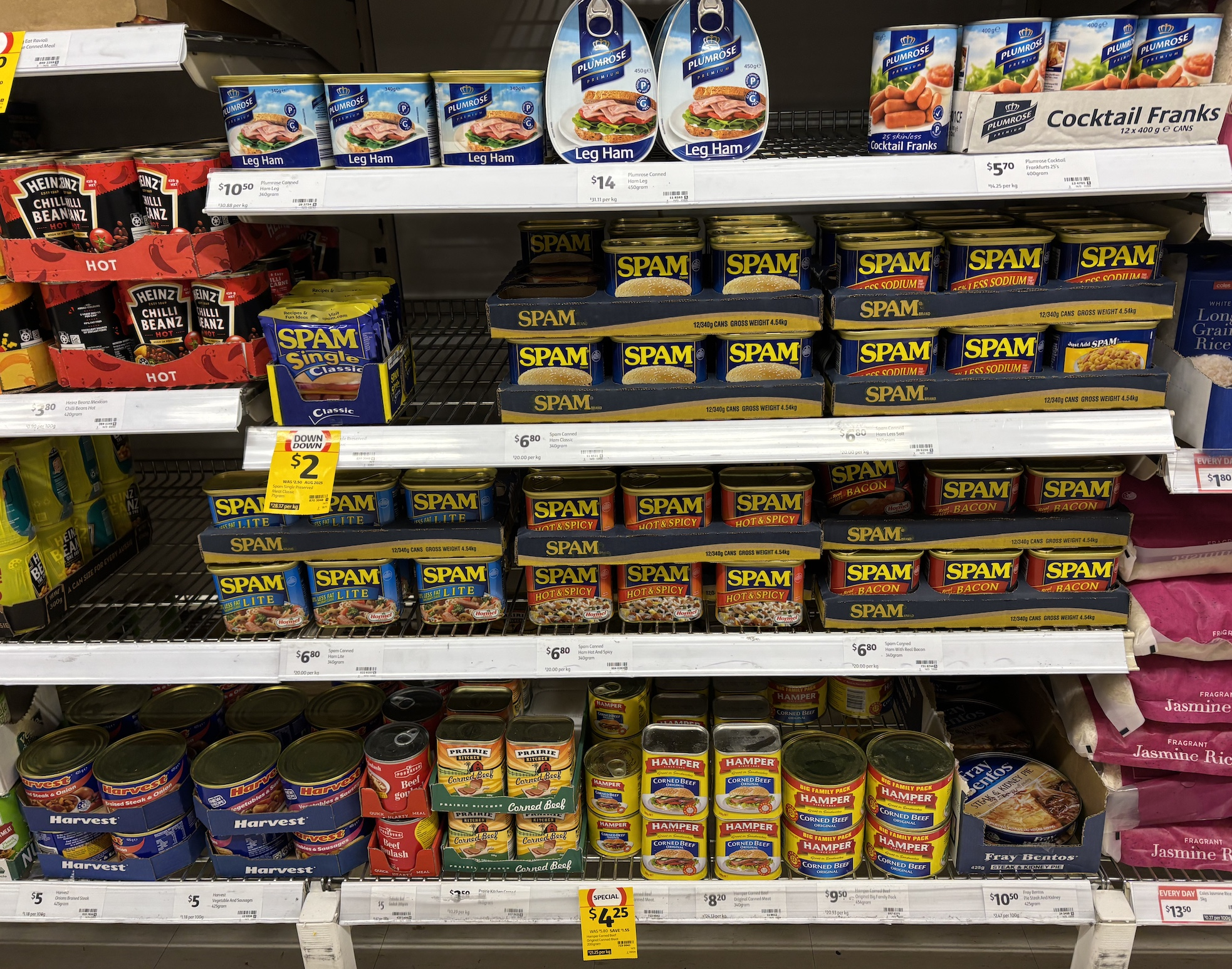
SPAM on a shelf at a Coles in Australia

During World War II and the occupations that followed, Spam was introduced into Guam, Hawaii, Okinawa, the Philippines, and other islands in the Pacific. Immediately absorbed into native diets, it has become a unique part of the history and effects of U.S. influence in the Pacific islands. As a consequence of World War II rationing and the Lend-Lease Act, Spam was sold in the United Kingdom. British Prime Minister Margaret Thatcher later referred to it as a "wartime delicacy". In addition to increasing production for the U.K., Hormel expanded Spam output as part of Allied aid to the Soviet Union. In his memoir Khrushchev Remembers, Nikita Khrushchev declared: "Without Spam, we wouldn't have been able to feed our army."

The billionth can of Spam was sold in 1959, and the eight billionth can was sold in 2012. As of 2026, Hormel states there have been more than nine billion cans sold.

== International usage ==
=== United States and territories ===
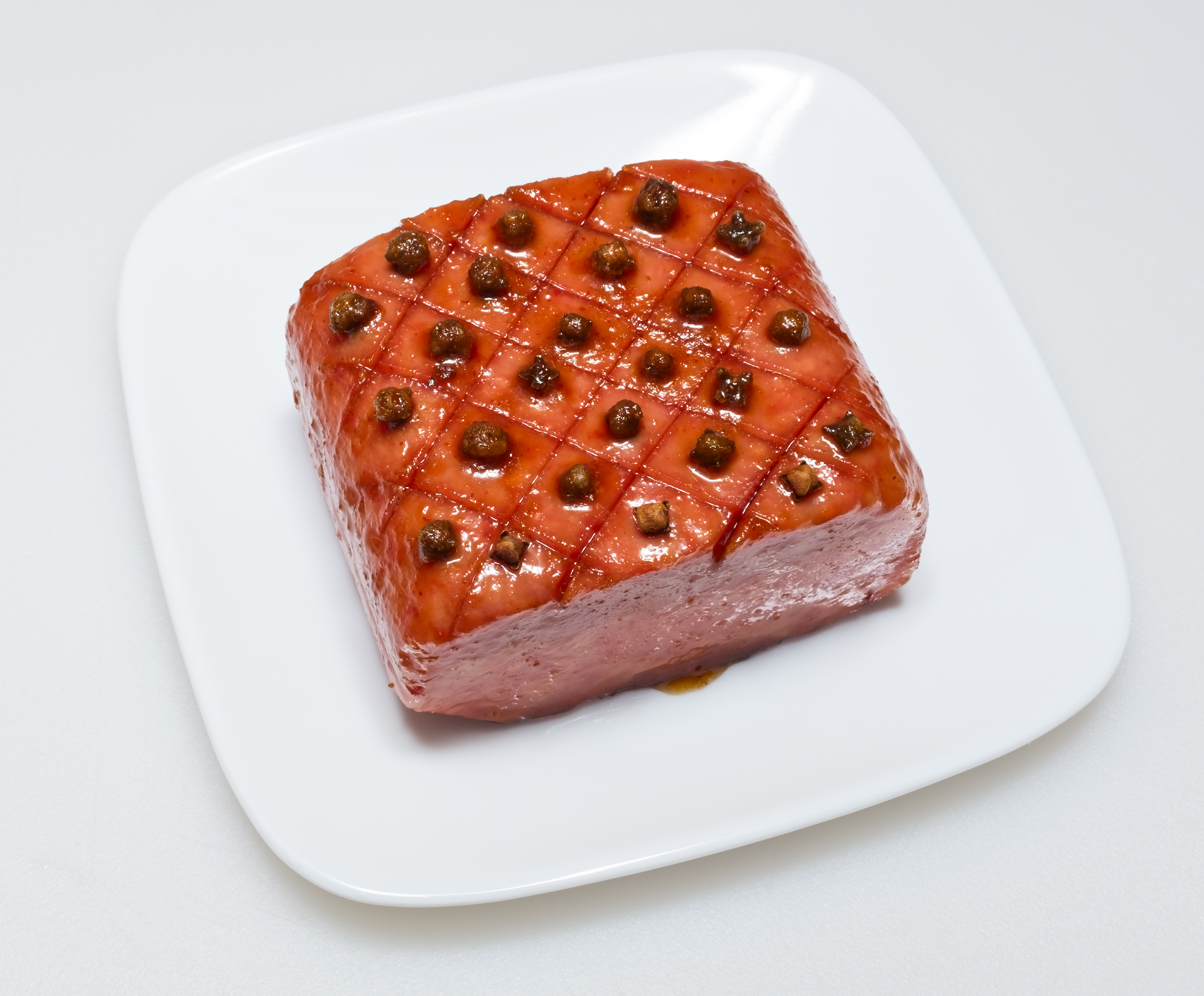
Baked Spam

Domestically, Spam's chief advantages were affordability, accessibility, and extended shelf life. Statistics from the 1990s say that 3.8 cans of Spam were consumed every second in the United States, totaling nearly 122 million cans annually. It became part of the diet of almost 30% of American households, perceived differently in various regions of the country. It is also sometimes associated with economic hardship because of its relatively low cost.

After World War II, Spam changed roles in the U.S. from being the main protein source to being a side dish or ingredient used in items like sandwiches and eggs.

Spam that is sold in North America, South America, and Australia is produced in Austin, Minnesota (also known as "Spam Town USA"), and in Dubuque, Iowa. Austin, Minnesota also had a restaurant with a menu devoted exclusively to Spam called "Johnny's SPAMarama Menu". At the National Restaurant Association's 107th annual Colorado trade show in 2026, Hormel unveiled the Spam Dog, a hot dog made out of Spam.

==== Hawaii ====
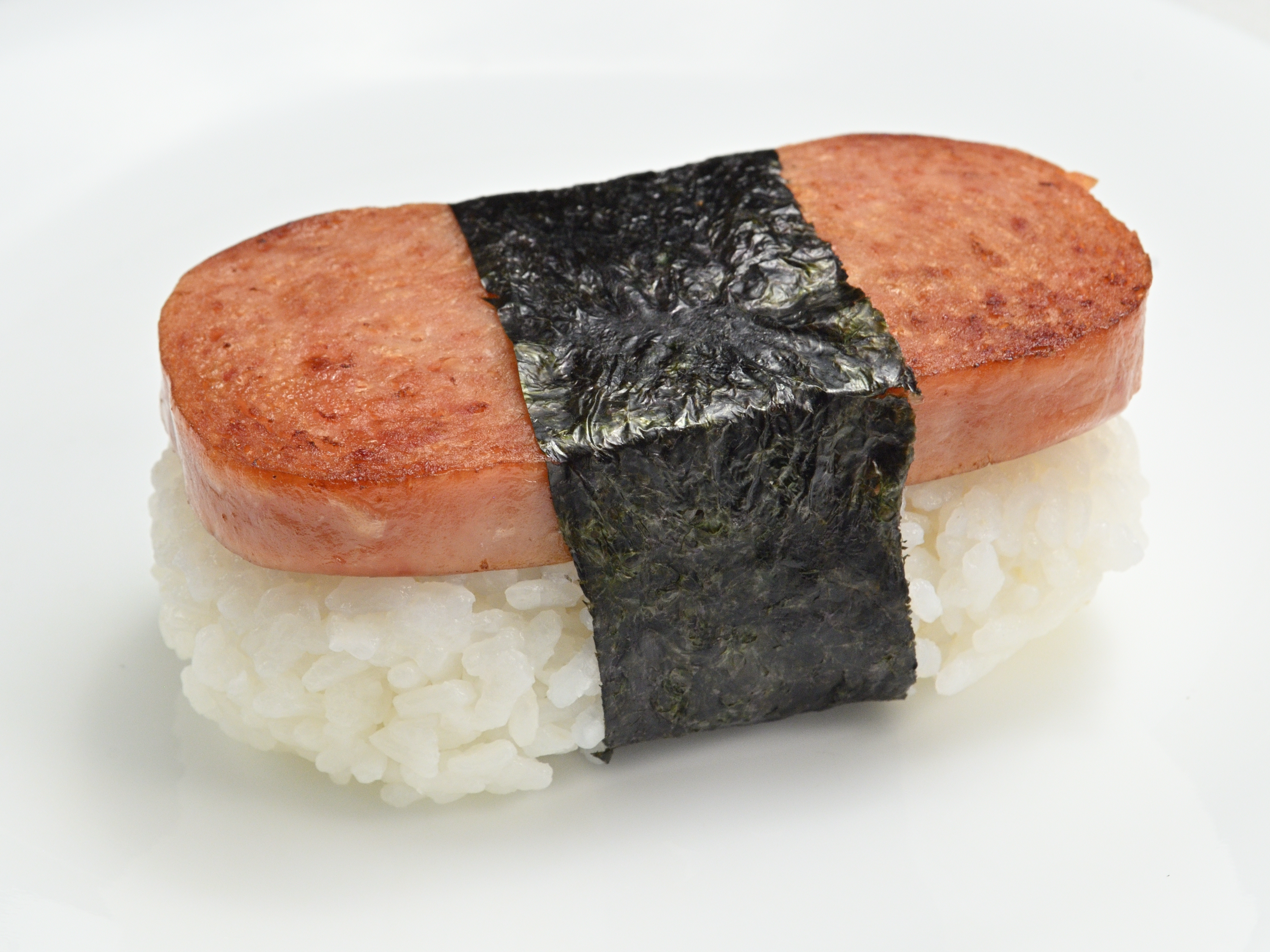
Spam musubi is a popular snack and lunch food in Hawaii.

Residents of the state of Hawaii have the highest per capita consumption in the United States, bringing in sales of 7 million cans of Spam per year. Its perception there is very different from that on the mainland. Hawaiians sometimes call it "Portagee Steak".

A local dish in Hawaii is Spam musubi, in which cooked Spam is placed on top of rice and wrapped in a band of nori, a form of onigiri or riceball. Varieties of Spam are found in Hawaii and Saipan that are unavailable in other markets, such as Spam with Portuguese Sausage Seasoning.

Hawaiian Burger King restaurants began serving Spam in 2007 to compete with the local McDonald's chains, which also serve Spam. In Hawaii, Spam is so popular that it is sometimes referred to as "The Hawaiian Steak". There is even an annual Spam-themed festival on the island of Oahu each spring, known as the "Waikiki Spam Jam". Local chefs and restaurants compete to create new Spam-themed dishes, which are then sold in a massive street fair on Kalakaua Avenue in Waikiki.

In 2017, Hawaii was plagued by a rash of thefts of Spam. Spam had long been a target of thieves in Hawaii, but the magnitude of the thefts ramped up, with incidents in which multiple cases of Spam were stolen at once. Local retailers believe organized crime was involved. This came alongside increases in thefts of some other retail goods, such as corned beef and liquor. The president of the retail merchants of Hawaii attributed the rise in retail thefts to a recent change in criminal law, which raised the threshold at which a theft would lead to felony charges by approximately $400.

==== Guam and the Northern Marianas ====
In Guam, the average per capita consumption is 16 cans per year. It is also found on McDonald's menus there. The Spam Games also occur in Guam, where locals sample and honor the best original, homemade Spam recipes.

In the Northern Mariana Islands, lawyers from Hormel have threatened to sue the local press for publishing articles alleging ill effects of high Spam consumption on the health of the local population.

==== Puerto Rico ====
The Sandwich de Mezcla is a sandwich that originates from Puerto Rico. It is made of Spam, Velveeta, and a spread made of pimientos between two slices of sandwich bread.

=== Europe ===
==== United Kingdom ====
After World War II, Newforge Foods, part of the Fitch Lovell group, was given the license to produce the product in the U.K. at its Belle Vale factory, Liverpool, where it stayed until production switched to the Danish Crown Group, owners of the Tulip Food Company, in 1998.

The United Kingdom has adapted Spam into various recipes, for example, sliced, battered and deep-fried into Spam fritters.

=== Asia ===
==== Philippines ====
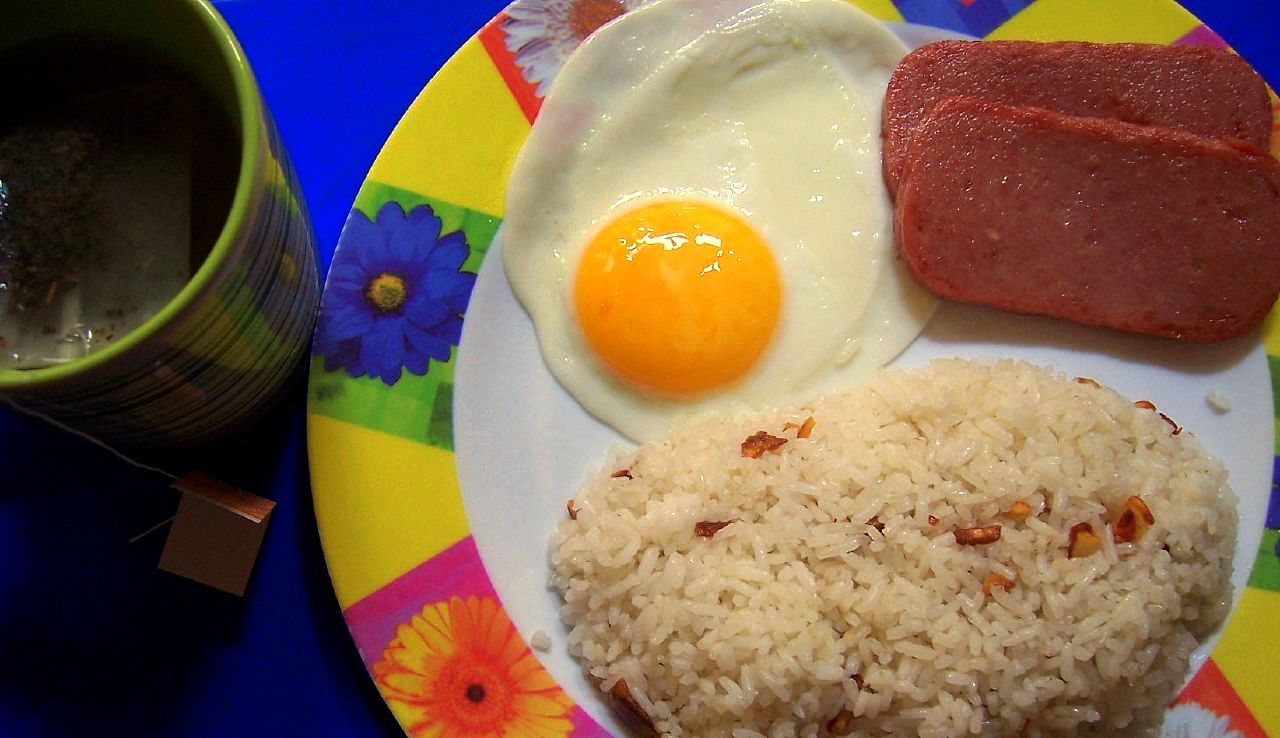
"Spamsilog", Spam with sinangag (garlic fried rice) and eggs, is a common Filipino breakfast combination.

In the Philippines, Spam is currently distributed by the Purefoods-Hormel Company Inc.. There, it is a popular food item seen as a cultural symbol. Spam reached the islands similarly as it did other former US colonies such as Hawaii and Guam: as a result of World War II rationing. Spam is commonly eaten with rice (usually garlic fried rice) and a sunny-side-up egg for breakfast. It is prepared and used in a variety of ways, including being fried, caramelized, served with condiments, or in sandwiches. It has also been featured in numerous Filipino fusion cuisine dishes, including Spam burgers, Spam spaghetti, and Spam nuggets.

The popularity of Spam in the Philippines transcends economic class, and the canned product is even given during holidays. There are at least ten different varieties of Spam currently available in the country, and an estimated 1.25 million kilos of the meat is sold every year in the Philippines. Its popularity among Filipinos has led to the creation of a version with sugar and annatto—Spam with tocino seasoning, made for the overseas Filipino market in the US and Canada. During the rescue efforts after Typhoon Ondoy (Ketsana) in 2009, Hormel Foods donated over 30,000 pounds of Spam to the Philippine National Red Cross. A chicken-based version is also available exclusively in the Philippines.

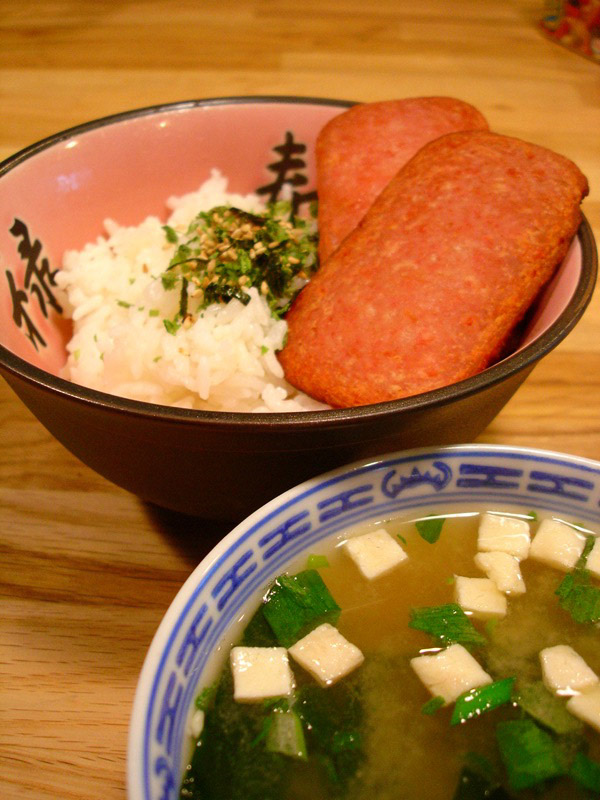
Spam is often served with rice in East Asia.

==== China ====
In mainland China, Hormel decided to adopt a different strategy to market Spam (Chinese: 世棒; pinyin: Shìbàng), promoting it as a foreign, premium food product and changing the Spam formula to be meatier to accommodate local Chinese tastes. Spam-like canned pork products are also produced by other food companies in China as "luncheon meat" (Chinese: 午餐肉; pinyin: Wǔcānròu; Jyutping: Ng^{5} caan^{1} juk^{6}).

==== Hong Kong ====
After World War II, meat was scarce and expensive in Hong Kong, so Spam was an accessible, affordable alternative. The luncheon meat has been incorporated into dishes such as macaroni with fried egg and Spam in chicken soup, egg and Spam sandwiches, and instant ramen.

==== South Korea ====
Spam was exported to Korea post-World War II, whose population was on the brink of starvation. Spam returned to South Korea and was widely consumed during the Korean War. US soldiers deployed to South Korea used Spam as a means of trading for items, services, or information around their bases. Spam and other meats were smuggled out of US military installations for the local population. Its popularity led to the creation of the Spam kimbap (rice and vegetable filled seaweed roll) in Korean cuisine. Because of a scarcity of fish and other traditional kimbap products such as kimchi or fermented cabbage, Spam was added to a rice roll with kimchi and cucumber and wrapped in seaweed. Spam is also an original ingredient in budae jjigae (부대찌개; lit. 'army base stew'), a spicy stew with different types of preserved meat or kimchi.

In South Korea, Spam, under license from Hormel by CJ CheilJedang, is popular with a majority of the population. As of 2004, South Korea produced and consumed more Spam than any other country except the United States. It is considered something of a luxury dish and is a common gift for Korean New Year combined with cooking oil and seasoning.

==== Japan ====
In Okinawa, Japan, the product is added into onigiri alongside eggs and used as a staple ingredient in the traditional Okinawan dish chanpurū, and a Spam burger is sold by local fast food chain Jef. For the 70th anniversary of Spam in 2007, cans with special designs were sold in Japan due to its popularity, primarily in Okinawa. Spam sales in Japan declined after the 2011 Tōhoku earthquake and tsunami, and Hormel shifted its focus to China, although it pledged to donate $100,000 along with cans of Spam for relief efforts.

In the summer of 2011, Burger King introduced its own version of a burger made of Spam, called 'BK Shot' Spam Burgers. These small burgers are filled with slices of the canned meat and were an attempt by Burger King to capitalize on Spam's popularity in Japan. In early 2014, Burger King also introduced the Spam and Cheese burger as a breakfast menu item.

== In popular culture ==
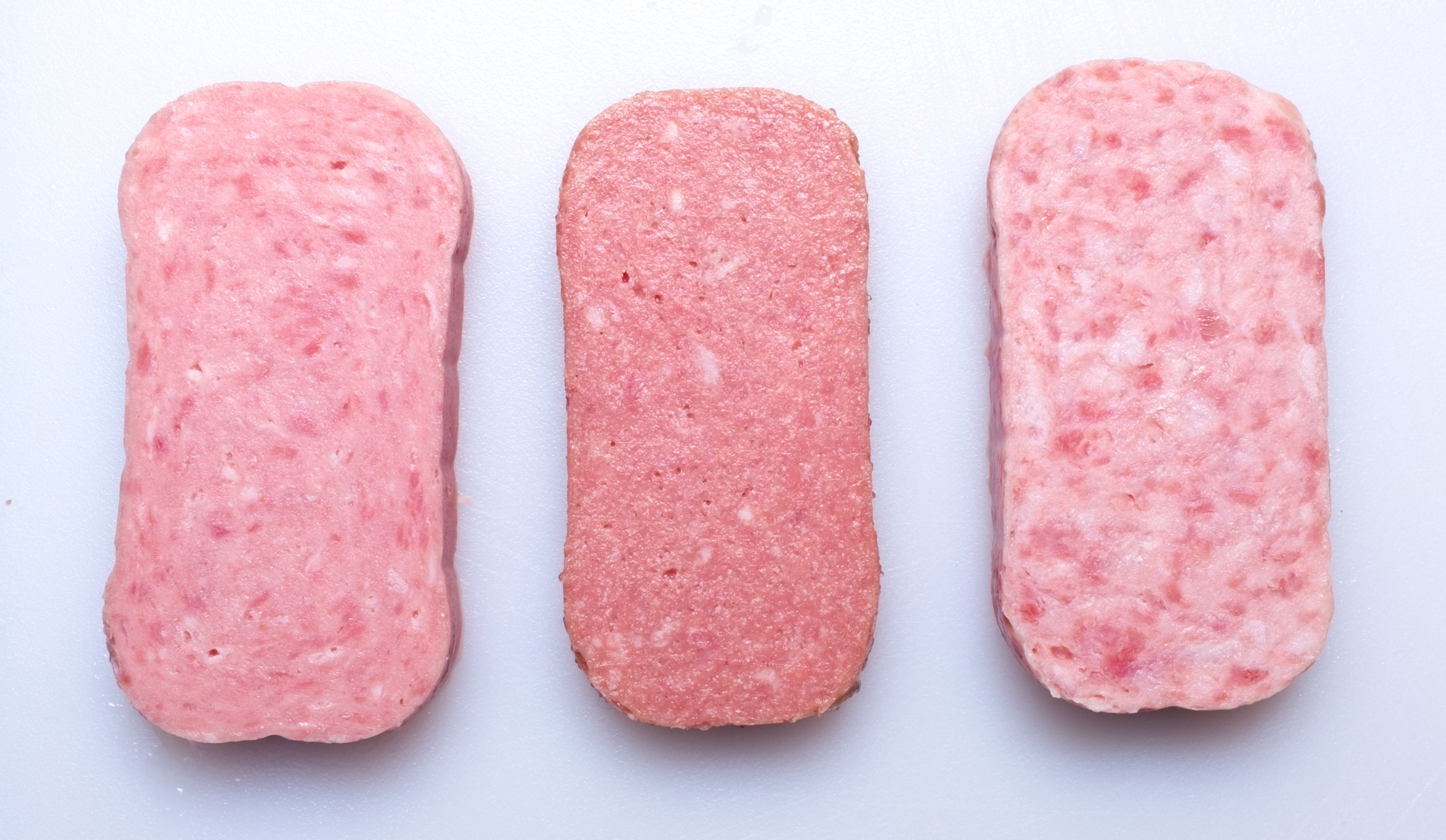
Comparison of Spam with similar products: Spam (L), Treet (C), and Walmart Great Value Luncheon Meat (R)

From 1940 to 1941, Spam sponsored George Burns and Gracie Allen on their radio program.

During World War II, Spam was not only eaten but was also incorporated into many other aspects of the war (grease for guns, cans for scrap metal, etc.); it was so prominent that Uncle Sam was nicknamed "Uncle Spam". Other terms influenced by the product's name include the European invasion fleet or the "Spam Fleet". Furthermore, the United Service Organizations (USO) toured the "Spam Circuit". In 1943, comedian Suzette Tarri appeared as the harassed waitress character "Mrs. Spam" in the British film Somewhere in Civvies.

In 1946, during the aftermath of World War II, a troupe of former United States servicewomen was assembled by Hormel Foods to promote Spam from coast to coast. The group was known as the Hormel Girls and associated the food with patriotism. In 1948, two years after its formation, the troupe had grown to 60 women, with 16 forming an orchestra. The show became a radio program where the main selling point was Spam. The Hormel Girls were disbanded in 1953.

Spam has long had a somewhat dubious reputation in the United States and, to a lesser degree, the United Kingdom, as a poverty food. The image of Spam as a low-cost meat product gave rise to the Scottish colloquial term "Spam valley" to describe certain affluent housing areas where residents have an outward appearance of wealth but, in private, may be living at poverty levels.

=== Monty Python sketch and email spam ===
Spam was featured in an iconic 1970 Monty Python sketch titled "Spam", the concluding sketch of episode 12 of series 2 of Monty Python's Flying Circus. Set in a greasy-spoon café, every dish on the menu contains Spam, such as "egg and Spam", "egg bacon and Spam", and "Spam egg sausage and Spam", but many dishes contain mostly Spam, such as "Spam egg Spam Spam bacon and Spam". A modified audio version of the sketch appeared on Monty Python's 1972 LP Another Monty Python Record, and was also released as a 7" single.

The sketch concluded with a chorus of Vikings boisterously singing a song – "Lovely Spam, Wonderful Spam", which, by the 1990s, led to "Spam" being adopted as a term for unsolicited electronic messages, especially spam email, because in the song, the repeated singing of the word "Spam" drowns out all other communication.

Because Spam was mentioned in a song in Monty Python and the Holy Grail, "We dine well here in Camelot/We eat ham and jam and Spam a lot", the title of the musical version of the film became Spamalot.

=== Continued cultural presence ===
Spam is the subject of the "Weird Al" Yankovic song "Spam", which is a parody of the R.E.M. song "Stand". Other offshoots of Spam in popular culture include a book of haikus about Spam titled Spam-Ku: Tranquil Reflections on Luncheon Loaf. There is also a mock Church of Spam and a Spam Cam, which is a webcam trained on a can of decaying Spam.

In 2017, the SPAM® brand team launched the boy band ALL4SPAM in the Philippines as part of a new advertisement campaign in the region.

Spam is referred to in Island of the Sequined Love Nun by Christopher Moore, where SPAM is explained as "Shaped Pork Approximating Man", which was used to explain its popularity amongst Pacific island cannibals. In Top Gear: Polar Special, James May took a can of Spam to the magnetic North Pole and Jeremy Clarkson destroyed it with a shotgun. A common item in the Fallout games is a Spam parody called Cram, which is consumed by the player.

The limited-edition Pumpkin Spice Spam, introduced in September 2019, has gained the attention of the media and the public. In November of 2022, another limited edition flavor, figgy pudding, had released. In 2026, a flavor made in collaboration with Bachan's Japanese Barbecue Sauce was released.

On some occasions, Hormel releases special-edition cans of its regular varieties. One instance of which is April of 2025, to promote the live-action Lilo & Stitch. Another of which, in June 2026, had Hello Kitty on the label, as part of a collaborative campaign known as Tour de Sizzle.

=== Spam celebrations ===
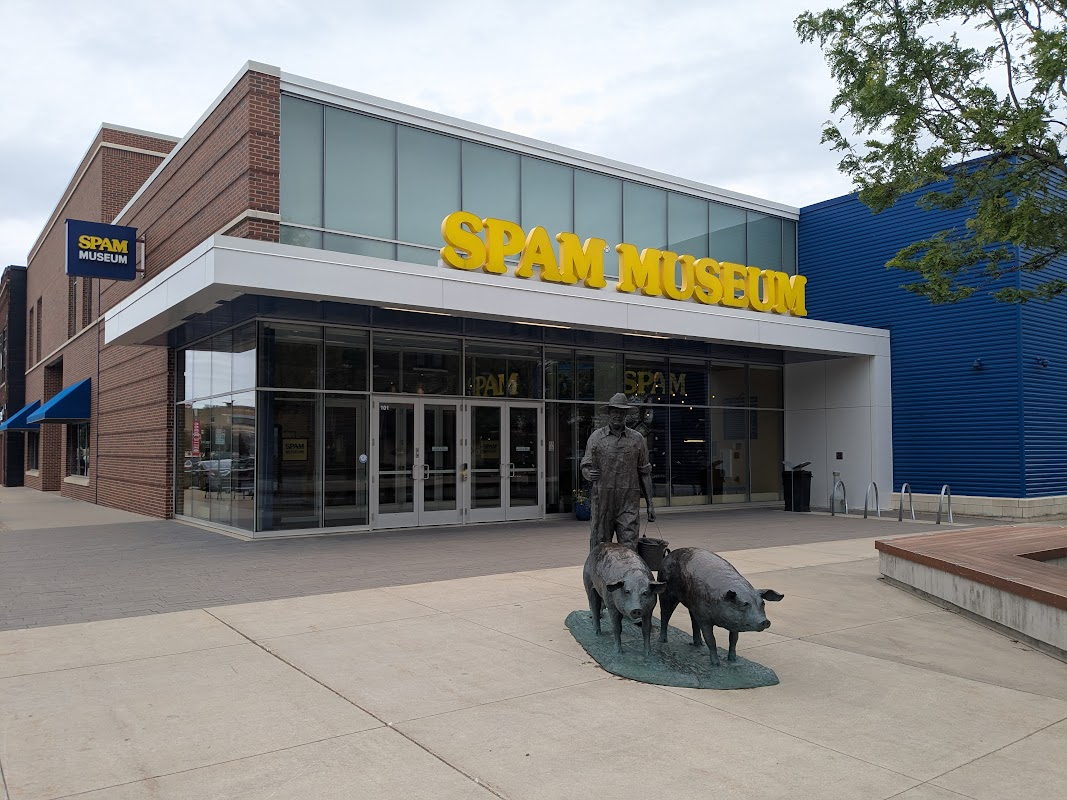
Façade of new Spam Museum

Spam is celebrated in Austin, Minnesota, home to the Spam Museum. The museum tells the history of the Hormel company, the origin of Spam, and its place in world culture.

Austin is also the location of the final judging in the national Spam recipe competition. Competing recipes are collected from winning submissions at the top 40 state fairs in the nation. The Spamettes are a quartet from Austin that only sing about Spam in parodies of popular songs. They first performed at the first Spam Jam in 1990 and continue to perform at various events.

Hawaii holds an annual Spam Jam in Waikiki during the last week of April. The small town of Shady Cove, Oregon, is home to the annual Spam Parade and Festival, with the city allocating US$1,500 for it.

Spamarama was a yearly festival from 1978 to 2007 in Austin, Texas, which had a peak attendance of 14,000. The themed events included a Spam cook-off (to contrast with Texas chili cook-offs) and the Spamalymplics, including a "Spam toss" and a Spamburger (a 12-ounce portion on a bun) eating contest. The event returned in 2019.

On August 8, 2021, L&L Hawaiian Barbecue established "National SPAM Musubi Day" to celebrate the iconic snack from Hawaii. The celebration also happened on August 8, 2022, and has since become an annual celebration.

== Nutritional data ==
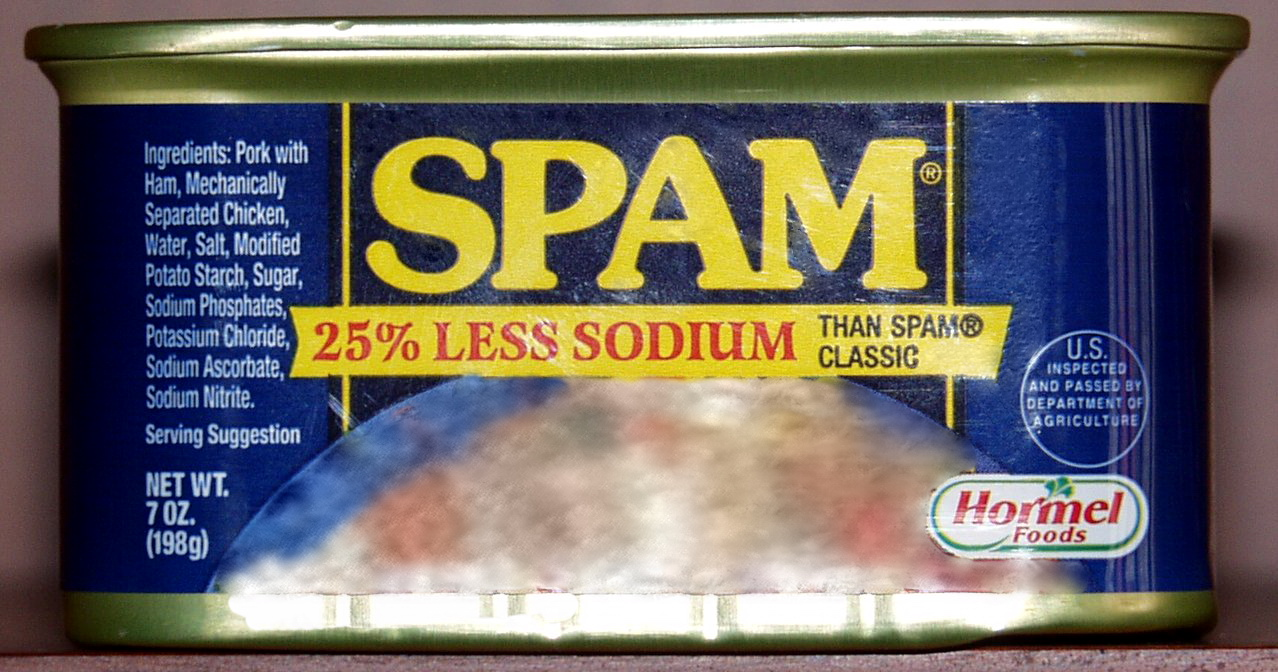
A smaller, 7 oz. can of low-salt "Spam 25% Less Sodium"

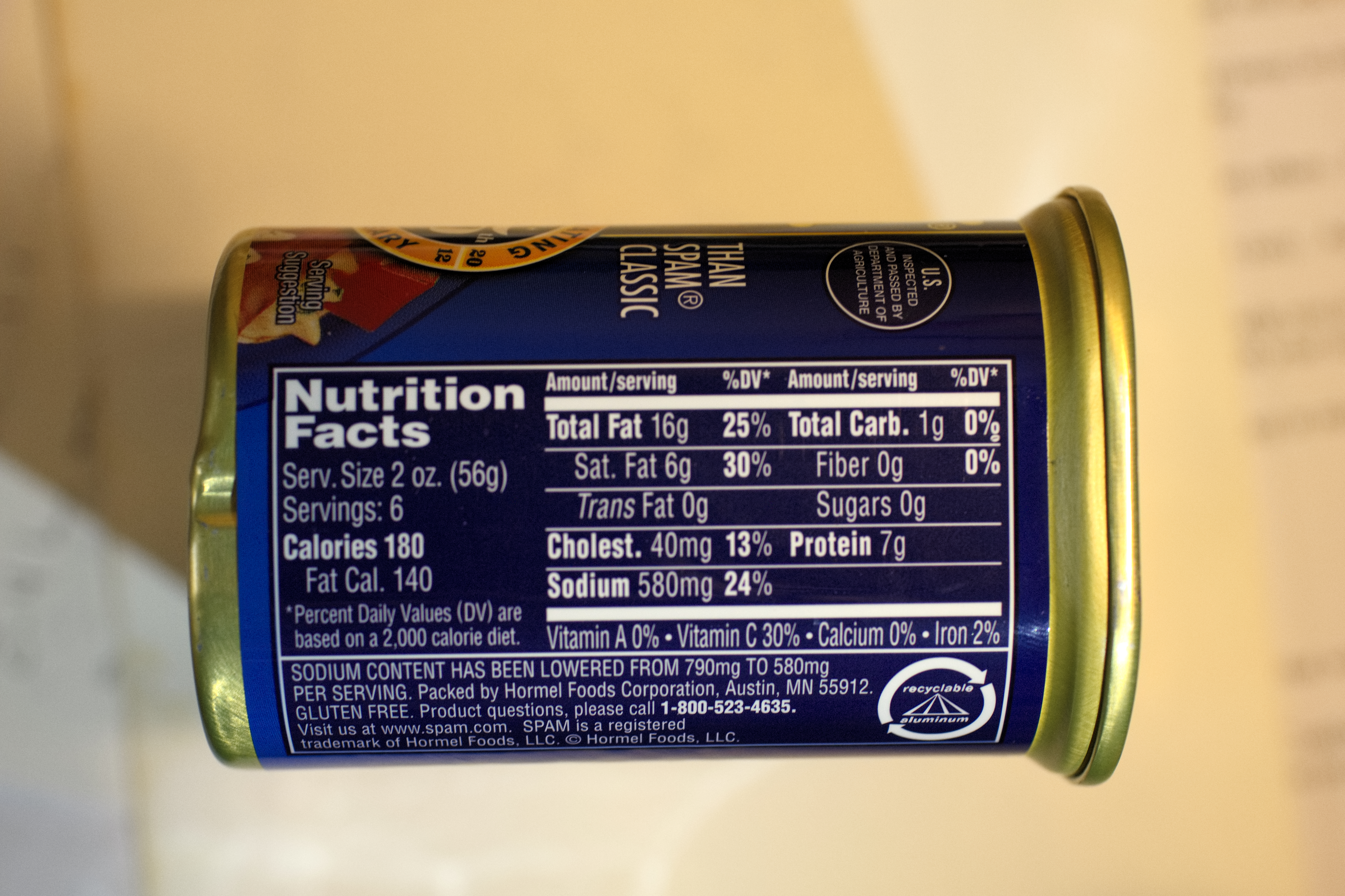
Nutritional label for a 12 oz. can of "Spam 25% Less Sodium"

The ingredients of Spam vary according to variety and market; those of the "classic" variety are pork with ham, salt, water, modified potato starch, sugar, and sodium nitrite. Sodium nitrite is a common preservative used in highly processed meat products. Even though it is not a listed ingredient, sodium nitrite is known to react in the presence of meat to form nitrosamine compounds, especially when exposed to heat. Because of this, and ample epidemiological data linking consumption to colorectal and other gastric cancers, the WHO has classified such processed meats as Group 1 carcinogens, known to cause human cancers.

Concerns about Spam's nutritional attributes have been raised because it contains twice as much of the daily dietary recommendation of fat as it does of protein, and because of the health effects of salt and preservatives.

Nutritional Information for Spam Classic
Substance	Quantity per 100 grams (3.5 oz) serving
Energy	1,300 kJ (310 calories or kilocalories)
Protein	13g (26% daily value or DV)
Total fat	27g (41% DV)
of which: saturated fat	10g (49% DV)
Carbohydrates	3g (1% DV)
Sodium	1369 mg (57% DV)
Cholesterol	70 mg (23% DV)
Vitamins and minerals (% DV)	1% vitamin C, 1% calcium, 5% iron, 3% magnesium, 9% potassium, 12% zinc, and 5% copper
Net weight per package: 340 grams (12 oz.)

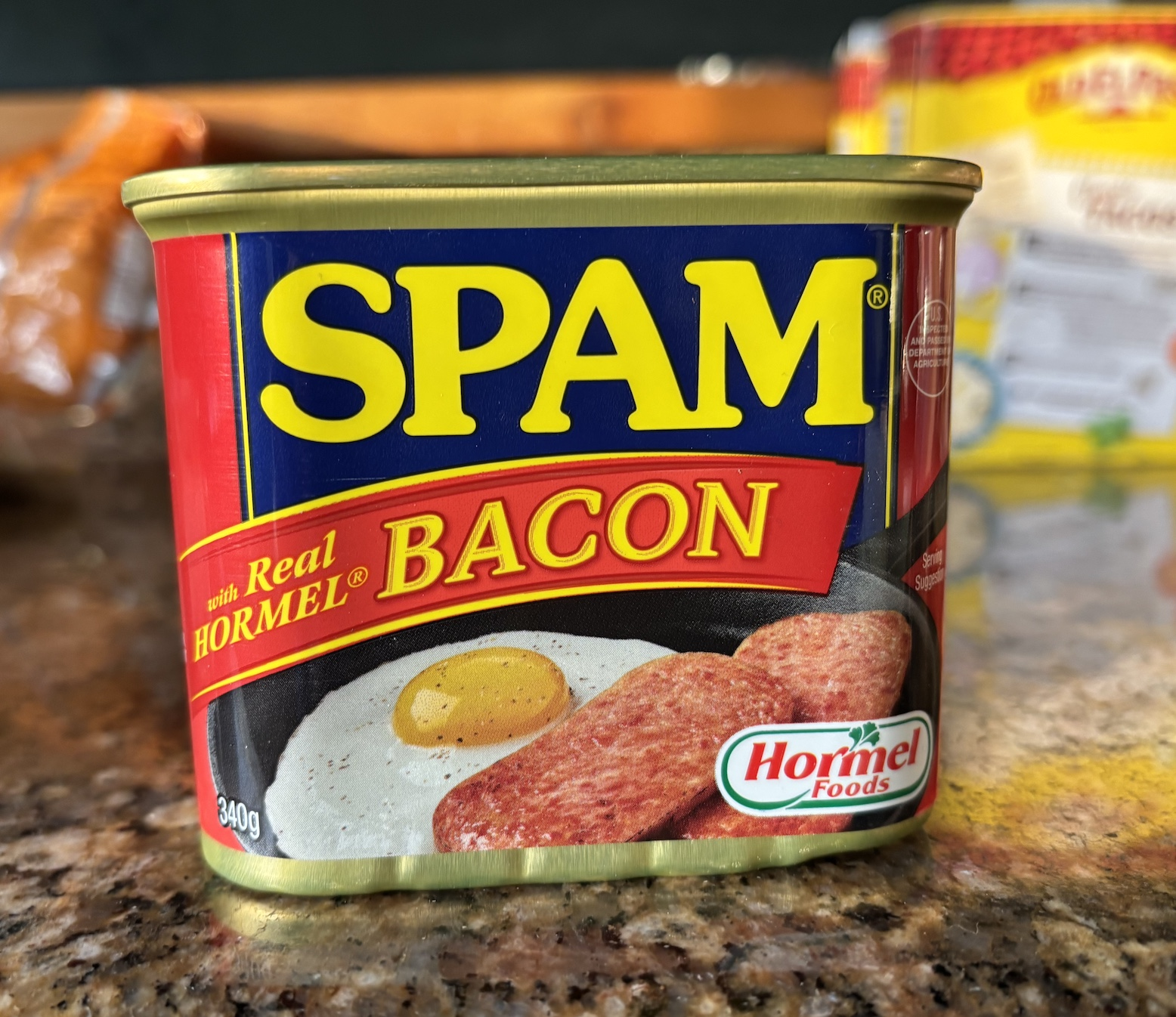
A can of Spam with Real Hormel Bacon

== Varieties ==
The official Spam website lists numerous different flavors of Spam products. Most varieties are permanent, but some others are limited time only. In addition to the variety of flavors, Spam is sold in seven-ounce (198.447 g) tins smaller than the standard twelve-ounce (340 g) size. Spam Singles are also available, which are single sandwich-sized slices of Spam Classic, Lite, Hot & Spicy, and Spam with Real Hormel Bacon, sealed in retort pouches.

== See also ==
- Back bacon – Type of bacon
- Bologna sausage – American sausage
- Chipped chopped ham – Processed luncheon meat
- Loco moco, which has variations that use Spam – Dish in Hawaiian cuisine
- Pork roll – Processed pork common in New Jersey, US
- Potted meat food product – Preserving food in fat
- Prem – A canned meat product like Spam
- Treet – A canned meat product like Spam
- Tushonka – Soviet canned meat product – A canned, stewed meat
