= Matthew Griswold =

Matthew Griswold may refer to:

- Matthew Griswold (governor) (1715–1799), Governor of Connecticut
- Matthew Griswold (Pennsylvania politician) (1833–1919), U.S. Congressman from Pennsylvania
- Matthew Griswold (singer), American singer and songwriter
