= Helen E. McMillan =

American politician

Helen E. McMillian
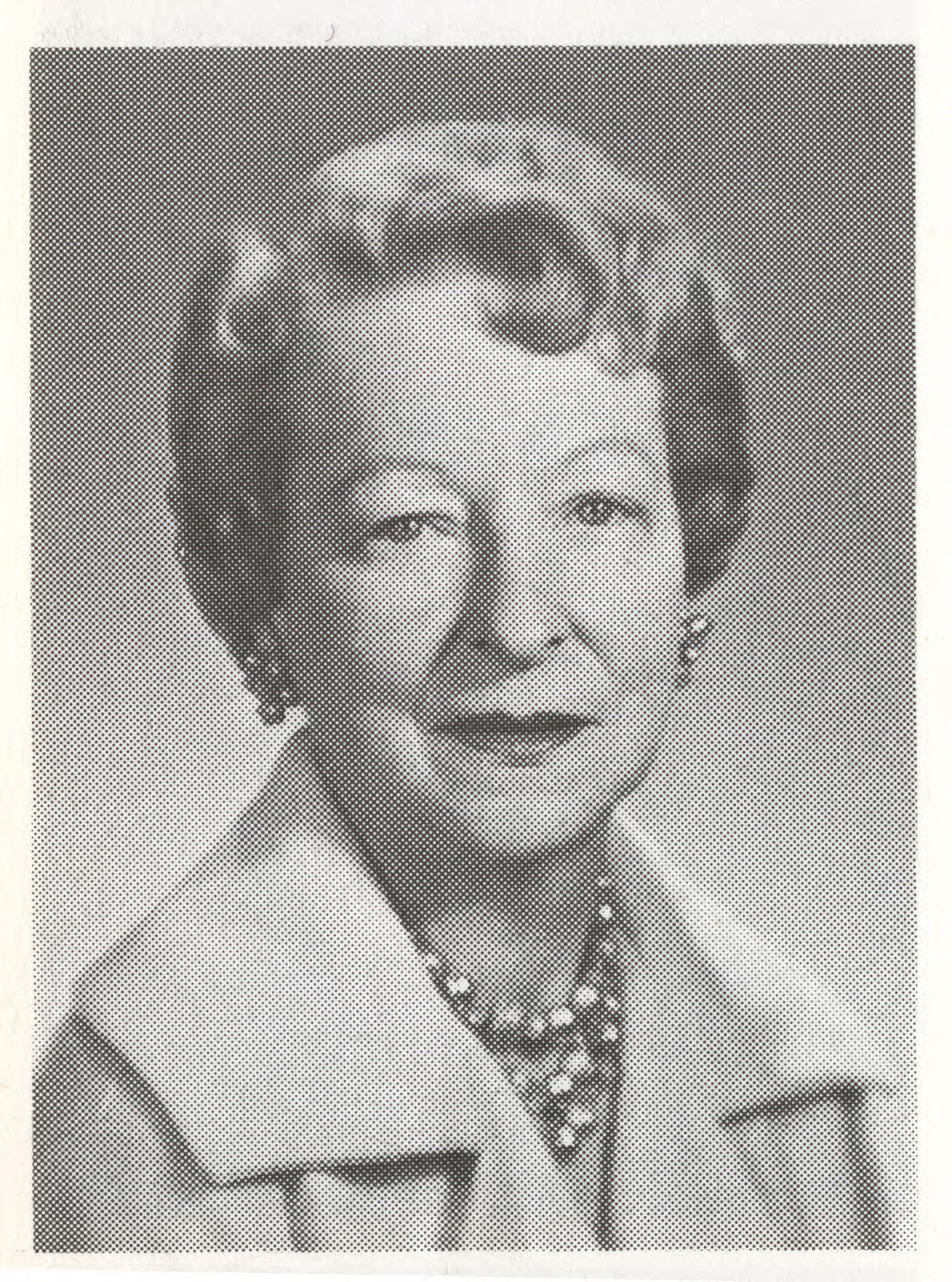

Helen E. McMillan (née Davis) (July 6, 1909 – January 29, 1984) was an American politician.

Born in Ortonville, Big Stone County, Minnesota, McMillan went to the Minneapolis, Minnesota public schools and to the University of Minnesota. In 1945, McMillan moved to Austin, Minnesota. From 1963 to 1974, McMillan served in the Minnesota House of Representatives and was a Democrat. McMillan also served on the Minnesota Human Rights Commission and was the secretary. McMillan died in Austin, Minnesota.
