= Paramount Theater (Austin, Minnesota) =

- U.S. National Register of Historic Places
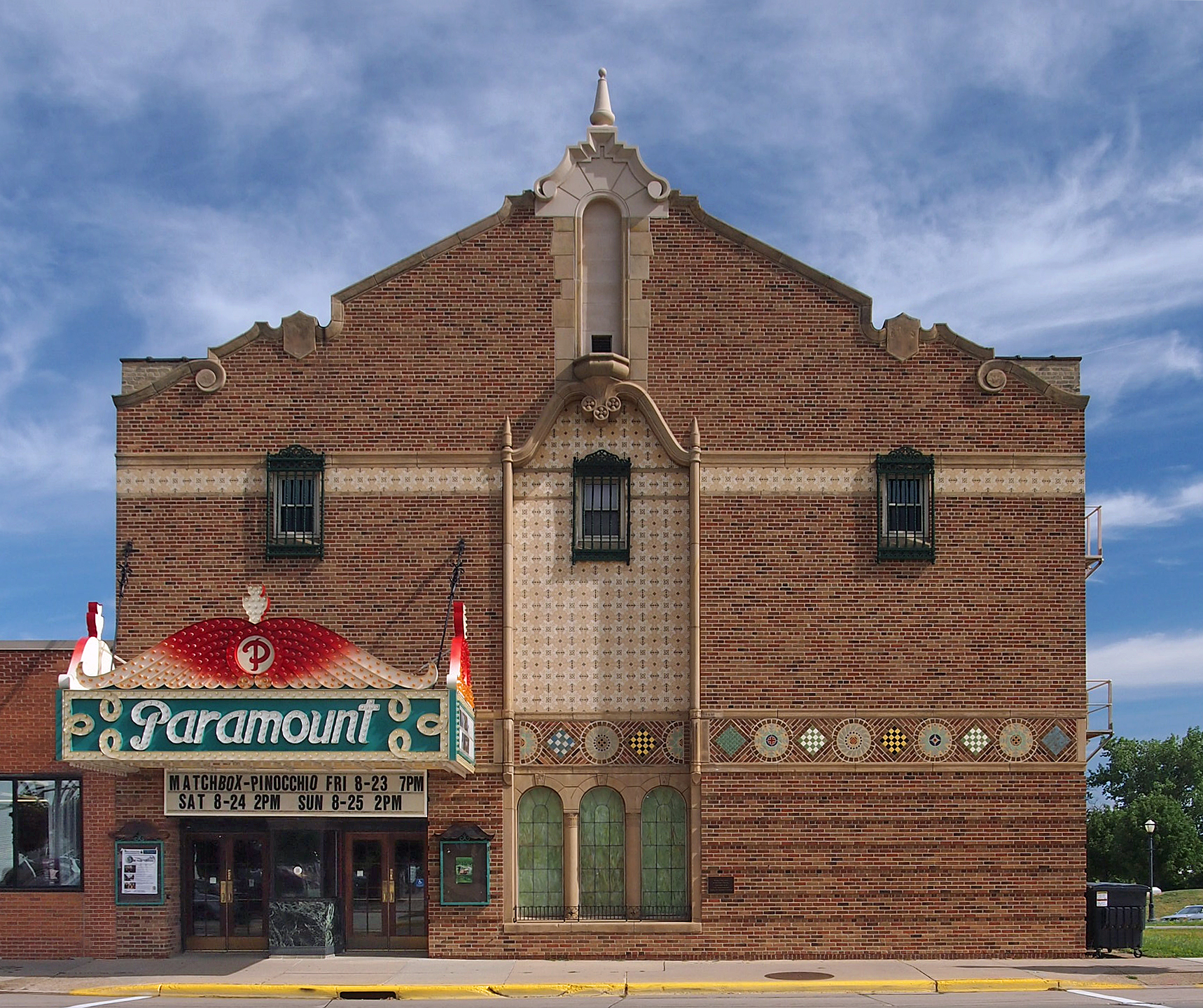
- Paramount Theater from the south

- Location within Minnesota Location within the United States
- Location: Austin, Minnesota
- Coordinates: 43°40′12″N 92°58′24.4″W
- Built: 1929
- Architect: Ellerbe & Company
- Architectural style: Spanish Colonial Revival
- NRHP reference No.: 86002906
- Added to NRHP: October 23, 1986

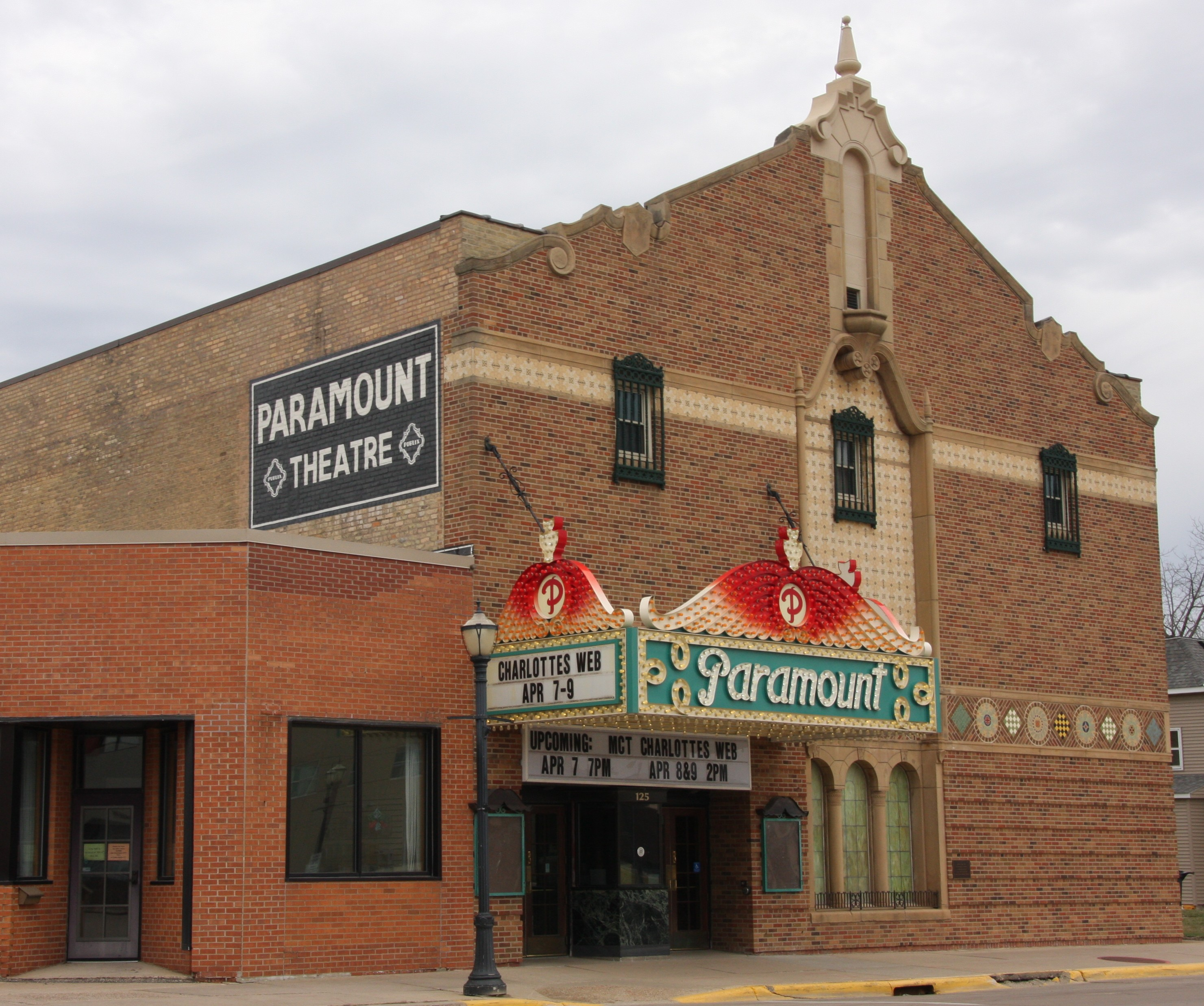
Side view of the Paramount

The Paramount Theatre is located at 125 4th Avenue NE, Austin in the U.S. state of Minnesota. The theater was built by Wagner Construction as an atmospheric theatre in 1929 to great fanfare, being the by first movie palace in Austin accommodating 914 seats with a small stage and orchestra pit.

The theatre was designed by Ellerbe & Co. of Minneapolis, and built on the foundations of the Park Theatre which was destroyed by a tornado in 1928. The owner of the Park Theatre, and Paramount's first manager, was Karl Lindstaedt.

Atmospheric design elements depict a Spanish villa under the stars. The lobby ceiling was painted with figures of dogs, winged creatures, and Spanish designs, and the exterior architecture is Spanish Baroque.

The Paramount hosted both movies and live shows in the 1930s and 1940s. In 1929, movie tickets were 10 cents for children and 50 cents for adults.

It served the town as a first-run movie theatre until it closed in 1975, the genre being quashed by television and mall cinemas. The last movie shown was The Godfather Part II. After closing as a theater, the building served as a disco, a nonalcoholic teen bar, and a comedy club.

In 1992, the Austin Area Commission for the Arts was formed to purchase and restore the building to its historic grandeur. Volunteers and donors, with the assistance of the Minnesota Historical Society, repaired plaster and masonry and replaced the seats. A stone spire that had been hit by lightning in the 1940s was also repaired. Precision Signs LLC of Austin, Minnesota recreated the original marquee from historical photos.

Now seating 622, this is one of only four such theaters in the state to be used as a theater. With a full year-long events calendar, the site hosts over 30 performing arts events each year and weekly movies. Key partners are Matchbox Children's Theatre, Northwestern Singers, Austin (MN) Symphony Orchestra, World Music Series and the Minnesota Music Coalition's Carvan du Nord.
