= East Side Lake =

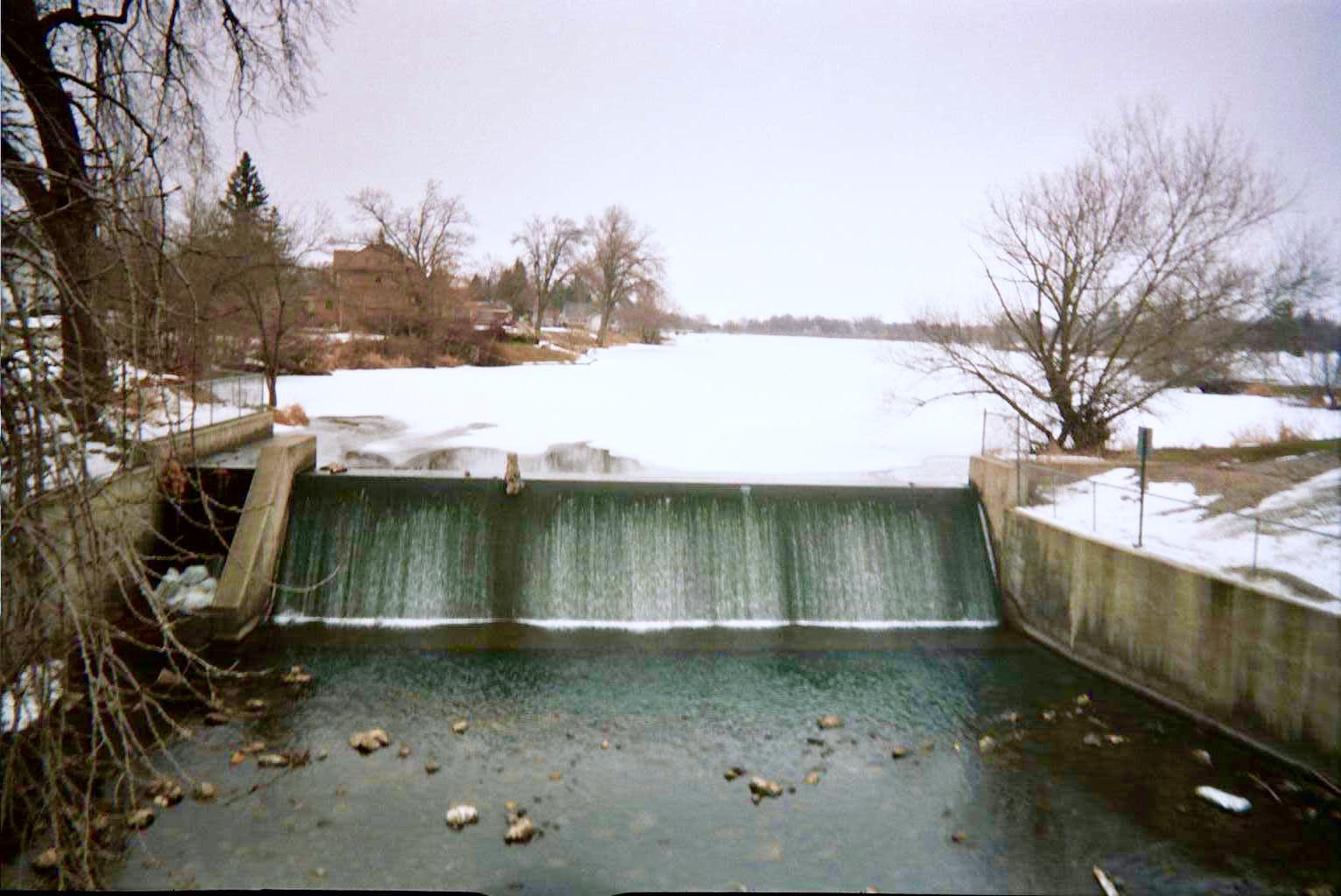
- In winter. Picture taken from the Oakland Avenue bridge over Dobbins Creek looking north-northeast.

- Location within Minnesota Location within the United States
- Location: Austin, Minnesota
- Coordinates: 43°40′16″N 092°57′10″W
- Type: reservoir
- Primary inflows: Dobbins Creek
- Primary outflows: Dobbins Creek
- Basin countries: United States
- Surface area: 40 acres (16 ha)

East Side Lake is a 40 acres (16.19 ha) reservoir in Austin, Minnesota in western Mower County, which is in the southeast part of the state. It is one of two man-made lakes in Mower County (the other is Lake Louise), which is one of only four counties in Minnesota without a natural lake. The majority of the lake is only 5–6 feet deep.

== Dobbins Creek ==
The lake's only tributary and only outflow is Dobbins Creek, which starts in Red Rock Township and flows through Nicolville.

For decades, untreated sewage (including feces) from the unincorporated community of Nicolville was dumped into Dobbins Creek approximately three miles (5 km) upstream from East Side Lake. Fecal bacteria were measured at up to 11 times the level allowed in surface water by state law. The town installed a sewage treatment system in 2010.
