= Austin Municipal Airport =

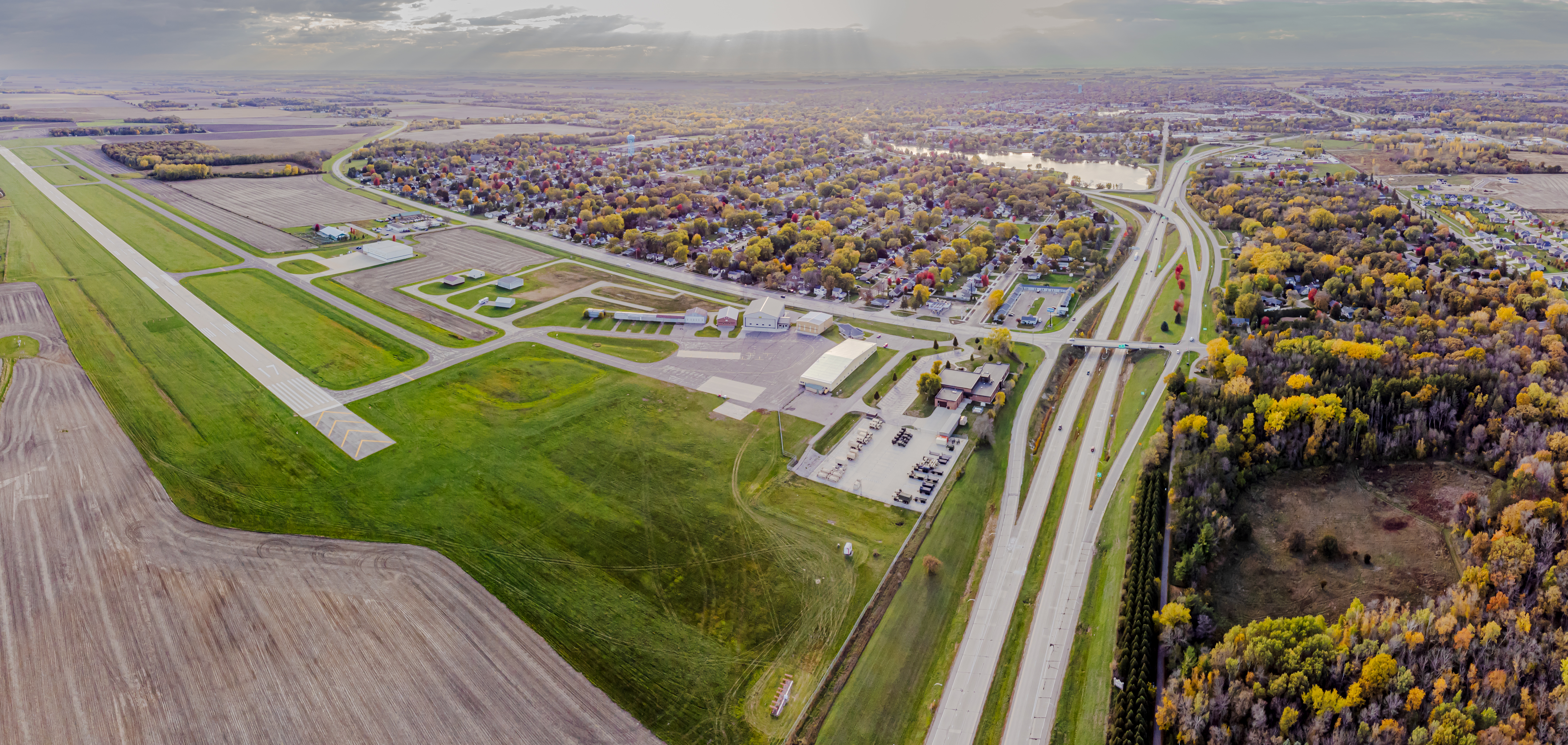
- IATA: AUM; ICAO: KAUM; FAA LID: AUM

Summary
- Airport type: Public
- Owner: City of Austin
- Serves: Austin, MN
- Location: Austin, MN
- Elevation AMSL: 1,234 ft (376 m)
- Coordinates: 43°39′45″N 092°55′58″W
- Website: www.ci.austin.mn.us

Map
- Location of airport in Minnesota/United States AUM (the United States)

Runways
Direction	Length		Surface
Direction	ft	m	Surface
17/35	5,800	1,768	Concrete

Statistics (April 30, 2007 - April 30, 2008)
- Aircraft operations: 25,420
- Based aircraft: 25
- Source: Federal Aviation Administration

Austin Municipal Airport (IATA: AUM, ICAO: KAUM, FAA LID: AUM) is a public owned public use airport located two nautical miles (3.2 km) east of the central business district of the city of Austin, in Mower County, Minnesota, United States.

== Facilities and aircraft ==
Austin Municipal Airport covers an area of 278 acres (113 ha) at an elevation of 1234 feet (376 m) above mean sea level. It has one concrete runway: 17/35 is 5,800 by 100 feet (1,768 x 30 m).

For the 12-month period ending May 22, 2009, the airport had 25,420 aircraft operations, an average of about 489 per week: 98% general aviation, 1% air taxi and 1% military. At that time there were 25 aircraft based at this airport: 80% single-engine, and 20% other aircraft.

== See also ==
- List of airports in Minnesota
