= Maranatha Bible School =

Bible college in Lansing, Minnesota, U.S.

- Type: Bible college
- Established: 1977
- Affiliations: Midwest Mennonite Fellowship
- Principal: 1st & 2nd Term - Glenn Horst, ON, CA 3rd Term - Dave Frey, ON, CA
- Students: 80
- Location: Lansing, Minnesota, USA; 43°44′38″N 92°58′5″W
- Campus: Rural

Maranatha Bible School is a Conservative Mennonite institution located in Lansing, Minnesota, United States. It is affiliated with the Midwest Mennonite Fellowship.

The winter Bible school has been identified as a contributing purpose for the formation of Midwest Mennonite Fellowship, its parent affiliate. The school was founded in 1977 and opened in 1978. Maranatha's maximum capacity at any one time is 80 students.

Classes are offered in three short winter and spring terms - 2 three week terms followed by a final six week term. Students at the school are required to take three classes from nine choices. Their weekday schedule includes meals, chapel service, several class periods, and prayer circles. Classes include history, Biblical study and interpretation, congregational singing, leadership and interpersonal relationships, among others. Completion of the full program results in a certificate of completion. The academic program is non-accredited. The curriculum runs twelve weeks, beginning with the two shorter terms the first full week of January followed by the final six-week third term.

Students live in dormitories on the school campus, eat food served by the school's kitchen and study in the library. They spend free time in the lounge or the gym.

All students are expected to participate in chorus, where they practice hymns or Gospel singing, entirely a cappella. At the close of second term, they give a choral program in nearby Austin, Minnesota. Third-term students also present a final program locally each year followed by a national (sometimes international) tour.
