= Southern Minnesota Normal College =

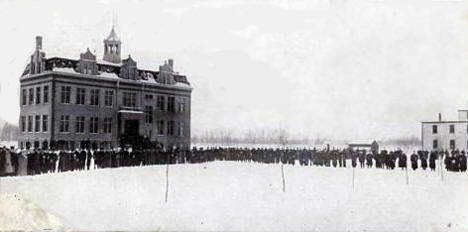
- Southern Minnesota Normal College, 1907.
- Former name: University of Southern Minnesota
- Active: 1897–1925
- Location: Austin, Minnesota, USA

Southern Minnesota Normal College, was a normal school and business school located in Austin, Minnesota that operated from 1897 to 1925. It was founded with the Austin School of Commerce.

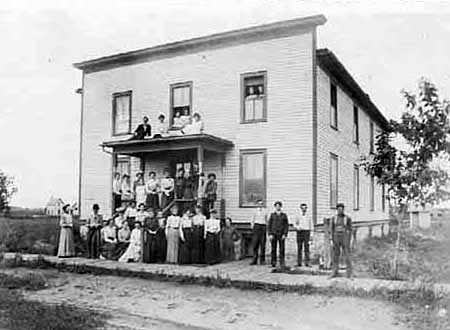
Harpman Hall, 1902.

The school was founded in 1896 by Charles Boostrom, and opened the following year. In 1913 the school began advertising itself as the University of Southern Minnesota to compete with the teachers colleges in Mankato and Winona. It focused almost entirely on preparatory education in courses such as auto-mechanics and stenography. The school closed in 1925 due to financial difficulty caused by the rate of declining enrollment.

== Legacy and aftermath of closure ==
The legacy of the college resulted in a need for skilled trades education in the area. In 1940 the public school system opened Austin Junior College, which later became part of the state system of junior colleges and was renamed Riverland Community College. Later the name University of Southern Minnesota became synonymous with Mankato State Teachers College as a result of a regional effort to establish a research university to address the growing needs of graduate education in southern Minnesota. That effort eventually stalled due to direct opposition by the University of Minnesota.

== Notable people ==
- Jennie Ellis Keysor (1860–1945), educator, writer
