= Jennie Ellis Keysor =

American adult educator, non-fiction writer (1860–1945)

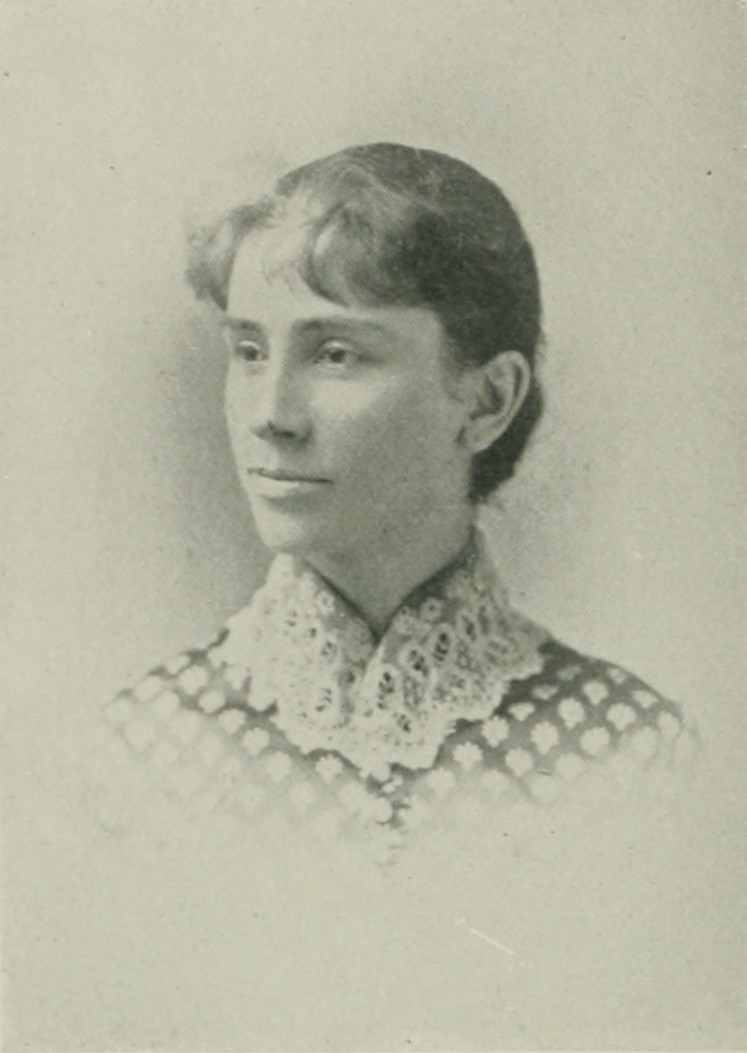
- Photo in A Woman of the Century
- Born: Jennie Ellis; March 1, 1860; Austin, Minnesota, U.S.
- Died: May 16, 1945 (aged 85); Kirkwood, Missouri, U.S.
- Occupations: educator; writer
- Known for: Adult education

Jennie Ellis Keysor (1860–1945) was an American pioneer in adult education. She was the author of children's books on American literature and art topics. In Omaha, Nebraska, Keysor served on the Board of Lady Managers for the Trans-Mississippi Exposition. She led the Art Department of Omaha's Woman's Club.

== Early life and education ==
Jennie Ellis was born on March 1, 1860, in Austin, Minnesota. Her parents, Allen Valois Ellis (1834–1909) and Helen (Quain) Ellis (1839–1917), were early pioneers of that city. Jennie's siblings were Gertrude, Mattie, Kit, Charles, and Sidney.

She was a high-school graduate of 1878. Immediately, Keysor began teaching in a district school, riding nearly 4 miles (6.4 km) on horseback daily and using the long ride in the study of English literature. She was graduated from the Winona Normal School in 1879.

== Career ==
In 1879, she was appointed to a position in the Austin school. She soon accepted the charge of the preparatory department of United States history, or civil government, of the Southern Minnesota Normal College.

In 1882–83, she completed in Wellesley College her course in English literature, history and Anglo-Saxon.

Keysor again occupied a position in the Winona Normal School, having charge of the department of English literature and rhetoric.

She resigned in 1884, when she married William Winchester Keysor (1852–1922), an attorney of Omaha, Nebraska, who became a district judge. For many years, he served as a professor in the Washington University School of Law.

Keysor wrote more than 40 art texts and reading books for the public schools. She was also a book reviewer, writer for the Popular Educator, and frequent contributor to other periodicals.

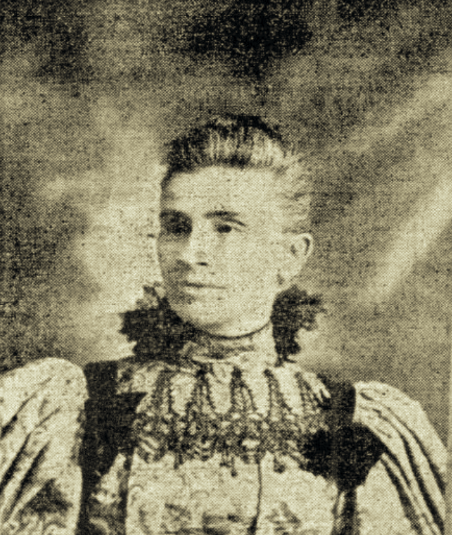
(1899)

In 1888, she went abroad, visiting England and Scotland.

In 1897, she served on the Board of Lady Managers for the Trans-Mississippi Exposition (Omaha, Nebraska, 1898). Keysor was a member of the Omaha Woman's Club, and led its Art Department, which had a membership of nearly 100 in 1898. In this department, Keysor gave a series of stereopticon lectures on art and architecture.

== Death ==
Jennie Ellis Keysor died in Kirkwood, Missouri, May 16, 1945. She was survived by a son, Harold C. Keysor.

== Selected works ==
- Sketches of American Authors, vol. 2, 1895 (text)
- Great Artists, Vol. 1: Raphael, Rubens, Murillo, and Durer, 1899 (text); Vol. 2, 1903; Vol. 3, 1899; Vol. 4, 1901
- Story of Great Musicians
- Introduction and explanatory notes to Sesame and lilies; two lectures on books and reading, by John Ruskin, 1906 (text)
