= Matthew Griswold (singer) =

American singer-songwriter

- Born: Matthew John Griswold; August 29, 1982 (age 44); Austin, Minnesota, United States
- Origin: Minneapolis, Minnesota, US
- Genres: Folk, Alternative Folk, Folk-Rock
- Occupation: Singer-songwriter
- Instruments: Vocals, Guitar, Harmonica
- Years active: 2008–present
- Label: Universal Production Music/APM Music
- Website: MatthewGriswoldMusic.net

Website

Matthew John Griswold (born August 29, 1982 in Austin, Minnesota) is an American Folk singer, songwriter, and musician who has recorded and released a catalog of albums and singles independently. He also writes and records both songs and scores for film and television, under a publishing/licensing deal with Universal Publishing's production music arm. He is currently based (as of 2026) in Minneapolis, where he remains a working songwriter and an active touring performer around the US.

He first made a regional and national name for himself by touring as a working musician, being a voice for Veteran's Recovery, and an Alternative Folk recording artist.

== Biography ==
Griswold served five years in the active military as an enlisted member of the U.S. Army, where he was a Military Police soldier and member of the 2nd Brigade Combat Team/First Armored Division (based in Baumholder, Germany). He was deployed to Iraq with his unit to fight in the Battle Of Ramadi(2006). Griswold has been recognized for his work in bringing awareness and being an advocate for "Recovery and Transition" issues concerning and affecting today's veterans. He has been a guest speaker and advisor to a number of schools, VA medical centers, organizations, and regional and national conventions, where he provides his insights on the issues of recovery for veterans.

After playing at the Blue Bird Cafe in Nashville in 2008, Griswold signed a publishing deal to license his songs to Film, TV and New Media, and has had a notable number of songs licensed for production media synchronization. He signed with Universal Music Publishing and their subsidiary licensing labels, APM Music and Universal Production Music in 2009. His music has been used in such films as “Old Man & the Gun”, “Warpigs: Block to Block in Fallujah”, “The New Environmentalist”, “High School Confidential”, and on streaming/television series productions such as Netflix’s “Sweet Magnolias”, NBC’s “Homicide: Life on the Street”, Discovery/Travel’s “Expedition Unknown”, NBC’s “New Amsterdam”, NBC's “The Today Show”, CBS’s “ The Late Show With Stephen Colbert”, BBC's “Copper”(Season 2) and Purina's “Just Right” dog food commercial. His scores have been used by BBC's Earth, Food Network, The Discovery Channel, PGA Tour, NFL, Sport Fishing TV, Animal Planet, Outdoor Magazine, Canadian Global News, and similar networks in over 30 countries.

== Discography ==
=== Albums And EPs ===
- "Screaming From The Witch's Tower" 2010
- "East Suburban Serenade Revival" 2012
- "Travelin' to the Grave" 2014
- "Taken to Sacred Ground[EP]" 2015
- "Lakeside EP (Vol 1)" 2017
- "Lakeside EP (Vol 2)" 2017
- "Land of Our Last Chance" 2019
- “Blue Note Poetry[EP]” 2025
- “My Kind of Folk(Vinyl)” 2025

=== Singles ===
- "With Healing Hands (Upon your heart)" 2010
- "The Fall” 2012
- "Knockin' On Heaven's Door" 2013
- “Till It’s Gone” 2014
- “The Death of George Floyd” 2020
- ”Round We Go” 2020
- ”Bound Away [Deluxe]” 2021
- ”Like a Storm” 2021
- ”Let It Go (Leave it Alone)” 2021
- ”Waiting” 2021
- ”The Great Divide” 2021
- ”Homemade Christmas Song” 2021
- “This Life” 2022
- ”All My Rage” 2022
- “Where Oh Where Can We Go” 2022
- ”Longer Way Back Home” 2023
- “Long Black Veil” 2025
