= Daniel Lubetzky =

Mexican and American businessman (born 1968)

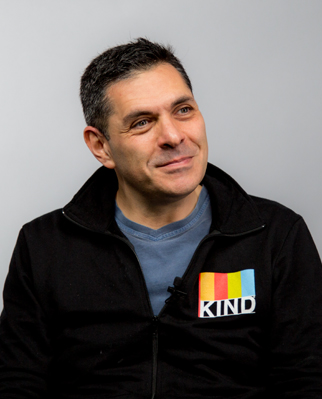
- Lubetzky in 2015
- Born: 1968 (age 57–58); Mexico City, Mexico
- Education: Trinity University (BA); Stanford University (JD)
- Spouse: Michelle Lynn Lieberman (m. 2008)
- Children: 4
- Relatives: Emmanuel Lubezki (cousin)
- Website: www.daniellubetzky.com

Daniel Lubetzky (born 1968) is a Lithuanian-Mexican and American billionaire businessman and author. He founded the American snack food company Kind LLC in 2004. He has also appeared in several seasons of the business reality television series Shark Tank.

== Early life and education ==
Daniel Lubetzky is the son of Sonia and Roman Lubetzky. Lubetzky's father, a Holocaust survivor and a Lithuanian Ashkenazi Jew, was a partner in International Bonded Warehouses and United Export Trading Association, two duty-free shop chains with headquarters in Laredo, Texas. Daniel Lubetzky was born and raised in Mexico City. As a teenager, he moved with his family to the U.S.

He received a Bachelor of Arts degree in economics and international relations, graduating magna cum laude, from Trinity University in San Antonio, Texas. As an undergraduate, he studied in Israel and France. Lubetzky then earned his Juris Doctor degree from Stanford Law School in 1993.

In March 2008, he married Michelle Lynn Lieberman, a physician. The couple have four children. Lubetzky is the cousin of three-time Oscar-winning cinematographer Emmanuel Lubezki.

In 2026, Lubetzky was reported to have laid tefillin with Chabad activist Yossi Farro during the week of the Milken Institute Global Conference in Los Angeles.

== Business career ==
While in college, Lubetzky created a retail watch operation, Da'Leky Times. After graduating from law school, Lubetzky worked briefly at Sullivan & Cromwell and at McKinsey & Company.

In 1993, Lubetzky was awarded a Haas Koshland Fellowship to write about legislative means to foster joint ventures between Arabs and Israelis. While carrying out his research, in 1994 he discovered a sun-dried tomato product that provided the foundation for PeaceWorks Inc. PeaceWorks is a not-only-for-profit business pursuing both peace and profit. Its flagship brand – Meditalia – is made through cooperation among neighbors striving to co-exist in the Middle East.

In 2003, concerned about unhealthy snacking choices and the rising obesity and diabetes epidemic in America, Lubetzky launched Kind Snacks with the slogan "Kind to your body, your taste buds and your world." In 2015, Kind was the fastest-growing snack company in the US.

In 2010, Lubetzky co-founded Maiyet, a luxury fashion venture committed to partnering with artisans in developing economies to create high-end products while promoting self-sufficiency and entrepreneurship.

In 2015, President Barack Obama and Commerce Secretary Penny Pritzker named Lubetzky a Presidential Ambassador for Global Entrepreneurship. In 2018, Lubetzky founded a New York-based family office, Equilibra (rebranded as Camino Partners), which backs entrepreneur-run businesses that offer packaged goods to consumers. Its investments include Greek yogurt brand Ellenos, and social enterprise Yellow Leaf Hammocks. As of November 2021, Lubetzky had a net worth of $2.2 billion.

In November 2020, Mars agreed to acquire Kind North America in a deal worth $5 billion. Lubetzky said he would retain his stake in the company and remain involved in its operations. In 2025, he sold his remaining stake in KIND and no longer has an active role in its operations.

=== Investments ===
Lubetzky established Equilibra Partners Management Inc. in 2018. The firm backs entrepreneur-run businesses that offer packaged goods to consumers. In May 2020, Equilibra purchased a 25% stake in Yellow Leaf Hammocks for $1 million when Lubetzky sat as a guest shark on Shark Tank. Later that year, Equilibra invested $18 million in Greek yogurt company Ellenos. Toward the end of the year, it made a $250,000 investment in FitFighter, a fitness brand which began with equipment for firefighter training programs and expanded to full-body fitness tools and workouts. In 2021, Equilibra purchased a 10% stake in Quevos, an egg white protein snacks company, this was also on Shark Tank. That same year, they invested in Tandm Inc., a family-owned business that created a tandem boogie board.

In March 2025, Lubetzky invested in Barry’s, LiveWell, and Well Labs+ through Camino Partners as part of its focus on consumer health and longevity. It was reported that Lubetzky no longer had a stake in Kind. Other investments include Cava Group, Justin's, Krave Jerky, gimme Snacks, Chapul, food company Belgian Boys, and HummViewer.

Lubetzky's Shark Tank investments include TOAST-IT (now Kiosco), History by Mail, and KIID Coffee. In 2026, Lubetzky became a partner in Neuro, a functional gum and mints brand founded by Kent Yoshimura and Ryan Chen. Lubetzky had been a guest shark when the company pitched on the eleventh season of Shark Tank in 2019 but did not invest. In the years that followed, the founders approached him for help with a trademark lawsuit, and he assisted them in reaching a settlement before formally joining the company as a partner. Neuro recounted the partnership with Lubetzky during a Shark Tank update segment in 2026 (season 17, episode 13), making it the first company in the show's history to secure an investment on a second appearance after rejecting a deal on its first.

== Media ==
Lubetzky is the author of the New York Times bestselling book Do the Kind Thing, Think Boundlessly, Work Purposefully, Live Passionately. The book is based on Lubetzky's entrepreneurial experience and was inspired by his father's stories from the Holocaust. Lubetzky has also published multiple opinion posts to CNN describing his opinions on how to stop violent extremists and lessons he will pass on to his children.

Lubetzky was a recurring guest shark on Shark Tank from Seasons 11–15. As of 2024, he has been promoted to one of the main sharks.

== Philanthropy and advocacy initiatives ==
In 2002, he co-founded the OneVoice Movement, an international grassroots effort, to amplify the voices of moderate Israelis and Palestinians seeking to end the conflict.

In 2015, Lubetzky and Kind Snacks created the Kind Foundation. Its signature initiative, Empatico, is a video conferencing and digital learning platform that connects classrooms around the world to help kids explore their similarities and differences and expand their worldviews.

In 2017, he launched a public advocacy organization called Feed the Truth to counteract the food industry's influence on food policy and public health. He pledged $25 million to the organization.

In April 2020, Lubetzky's Kind Foundation launched the Frontline Impact Project in consultation with Project N95. The project is a platform for healthcare and other frontline responders to request resources needed in the fight against COVID-19. As of May 14, 2020, Frontline Impact Project had partnered with more than 40 brands, including Unilever, Nestle, and Mars, reaching more than 180,000 people working mostly in hospitals, nursing homes, and outpatient medical practices.

In 2021, Lubetzky launched Starts With Us. Its movement partners include Jason Alexander, Mark Cuban, and Andrew Yang, amongst others.

In 2023, Lubetzky was part of a coalition that launched Builders, a nonprofit initiative aimed at reducing polarization.

== Involvement in advocacy and influence ==
In 2019, Lubetzky was appointed to the Anti-Defamation League's inaugural board of directors.

In May 2024, the Washington Post reported that Lubetzky was a member of a WhatsApp group of business leaders working to shape US public opinion about the Gaza war following the 7 October attacks against Israel. The group also organized a Zoom meeting with New York City Mayor Eric Adams after he released a statement condemning antisemitism on Columbia University's campus, where they discussed making political donations to Adams.

== Awards and recognition ==
- Koshland Fellowship
- 100 Global Leaders for Tomorrow by the World Economic Forum
- Trinity Outstanding Alumnus Award
- World Association of NGOs bestowed him with its Peace, Reconciliation and Security Award
- Catholic Theological Union's Blessed Are the Peacemakers Award
- King Hussein Humanitarian Leadership Prize
- Named a Young Leaders Forum fellow by the National Committee for United States-China Relations.
- Named as one of "43 Entrepreneurs Who Are Changing the World" by Fast Company.
- Recognized as a Young Global Leader by the World Economic Forum.
- Skoll Award for Social Entrepreneurship
- Named among "America's Most Promising Social Entrepreneurs" by Bloomberg News.
- Named among "25 Responsibility Pioneers" of social innovation by Time magazine.
- Selected as Entrepreneur of the Year by Entrepreneur magazine.
- Named among Advertising Age's 50 most creative people.
- Named among 100 most intriguing entrepreneurs by Goldman Sachs.
- Ernst & Young Entrepreneur of the Year 2013 Award.
- Heroes of Conscious Capitalism 2017 Common Ground Awards Winner
- Hispanic Heritage Award
- Horatio Alger Award
- 2023 Honored with the Carnegie Corporation of New York's Great Immigrant Award.
