= Mexican-American cuisine =

Culinary traditions of Mexican Americans

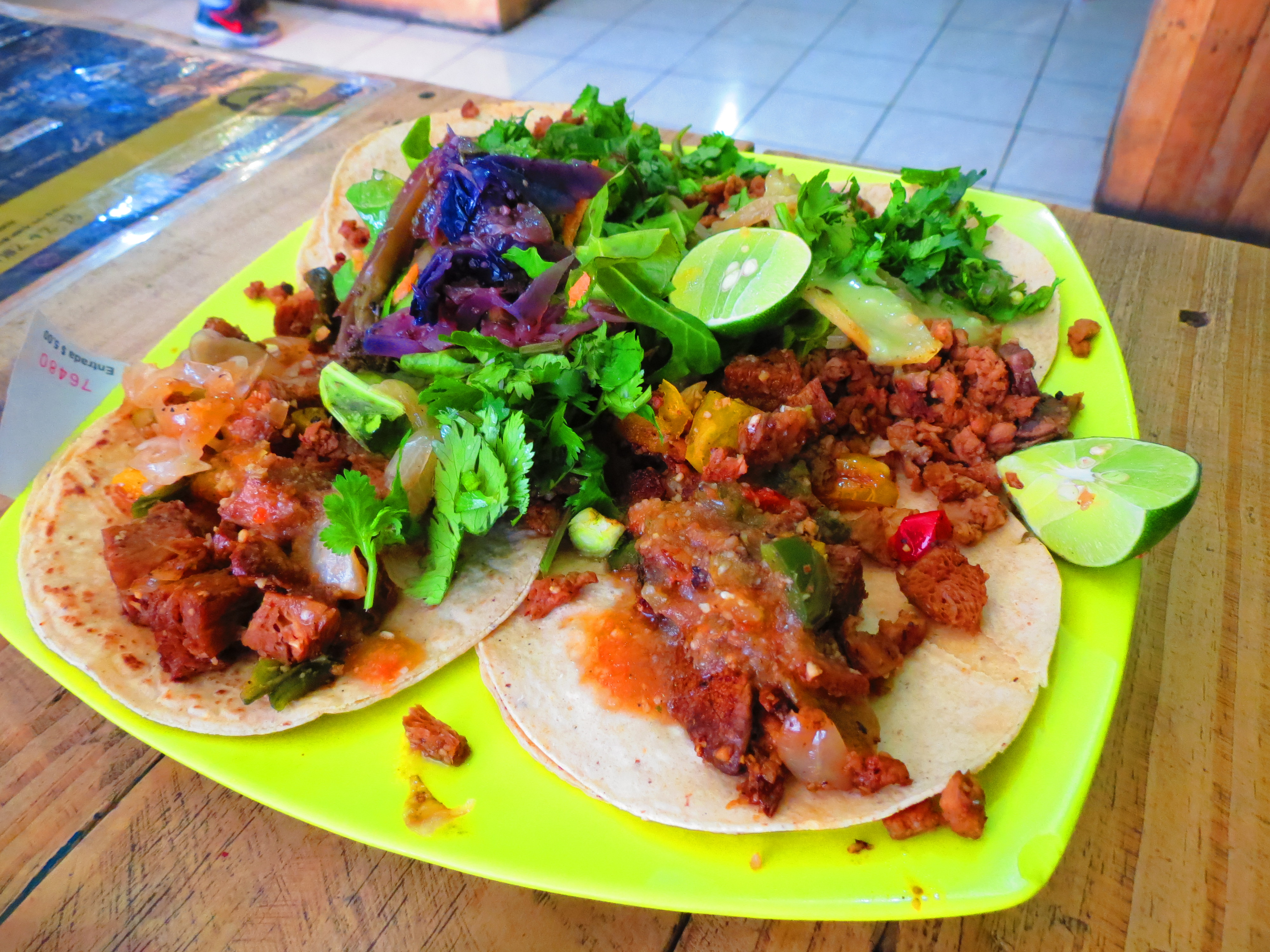
Tacos are a common food in Mexican cuisine

Mexican-American cuisine is the cuisine of Mexican Americans and their descendants, who have modified Mexican cuisine under the influence of American culture and immigration patterns of Mexicans to the United States.

What many recognize as Mexican cuisine is the product of a storied fusion of cultures and flavors. Its culinary adaptability has impacted its spread and popularity on a global scale, and its presence in the United States is no exception. Culinary staples like tortillas, salsa, chips, chili, burritos, and tacos help to formulate many Americans' notions of Mexican food.

Due in part to big business, immigration, and widespread likability, Mexican food and dishes have largely become regular constituents in American homes. While some of these popular iterations of Mexican food are far removed from their Mexican origins, they make up a large portion of the diets of many Americans. Additionally, more traditional Mexican cuisine has become increasingly common in the United States as it further diffuses to regions far from the U.S.-Mexico border.

== History ==
=== Pre-Columbian Mexican cuisine ===
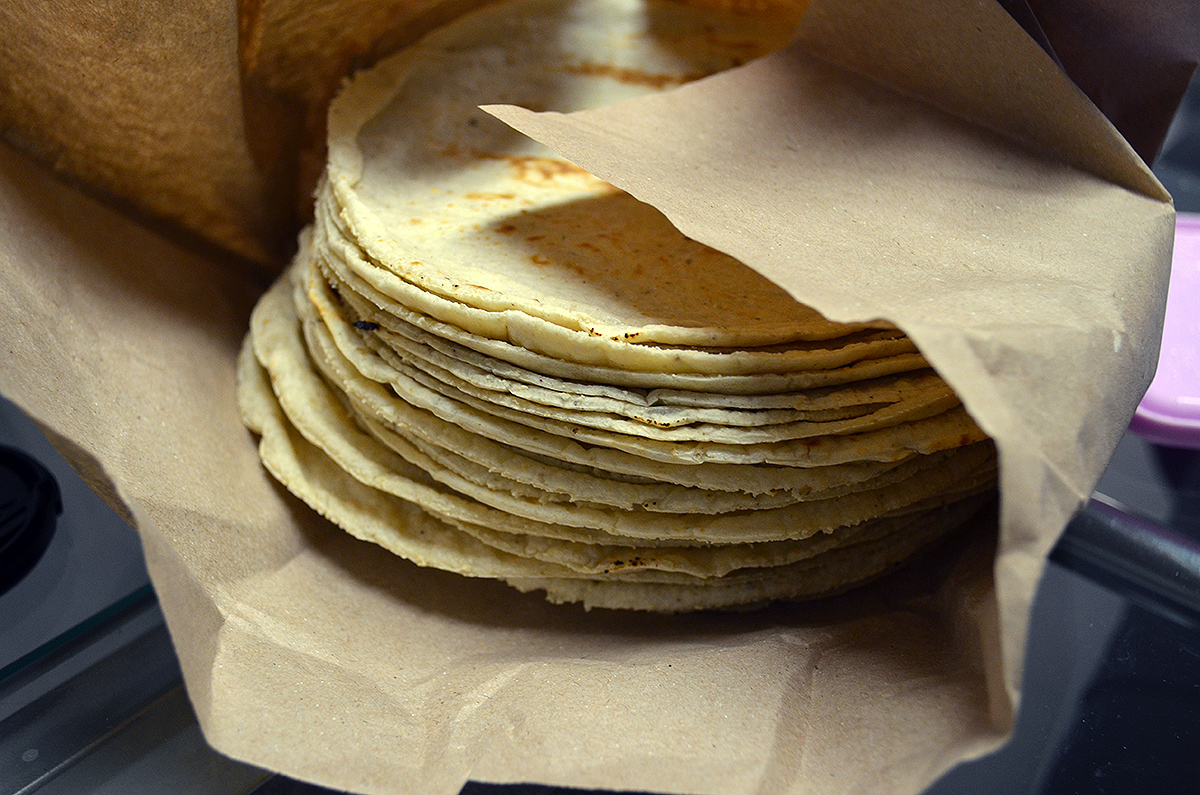
Flat tortillas made of corn were common in the diet of indigenous Aztec people

Maize (corn) was the foundation of the diet of indigenous Aztec people due to its drought-resistance and plentiful yields. Indigenous people found several uses for maize, such as:

- Atole – thick, paste-like gruel made from boiled maize
- Tortillas – flatbread made from ground maize and cooked over heat on clay surfaces
- Tamales – steamed maize dough (masa) with a spongy consistency

Native-grown vegetables included squash, tomatillo, tomato, cactus, and chile. These vegetables formed the bases of many sauces and were often cooked with maize in a wide variety of dishes. Fish, birds, larger game, insects, berries, fruits, sugarcane and rice, among other plants, were also common staples of the indigenous diet. Chocolate was also a common delicacy of the indigenous populations.

=== Influence of Spanish conquistadors ===
Spanish conquistadors hoped to find foods in the New World similar to those they were familiar with from Spain. Aztec cuisine proved to be quite different, and the staple crops had not been developed sufficiently to support the livestock and populations the Spaniards hoped to establish. They considered maize to be a better food for pigs than humans. The Spanish introduced wheat to the natives, who used it to make flour tortillas. Spanish settlers also introduced chickens, cattle, sheep, goats, pigs, horses, and donkeys as sources of food and labor. It took time for natives to acclimate to these European tastes, but over time, cultural blending did occur.

=== After Mexican independence ===
By the eighteenth century, Spanish cuisine had evolved a blander taste that departed from its spicier culinary roots. This served as a contrast between Mexican cuisine at the time of the Mexican Revolution. Instead of further changing their cuisine to match that of Spain, patriotism in the new country led Mexicans to embrace their history of spicy foods, using chile as an integral part of many dishes. This marks one of the first major differences between the new Mexican nation and Spain.

=== Diffusion to the United States ===
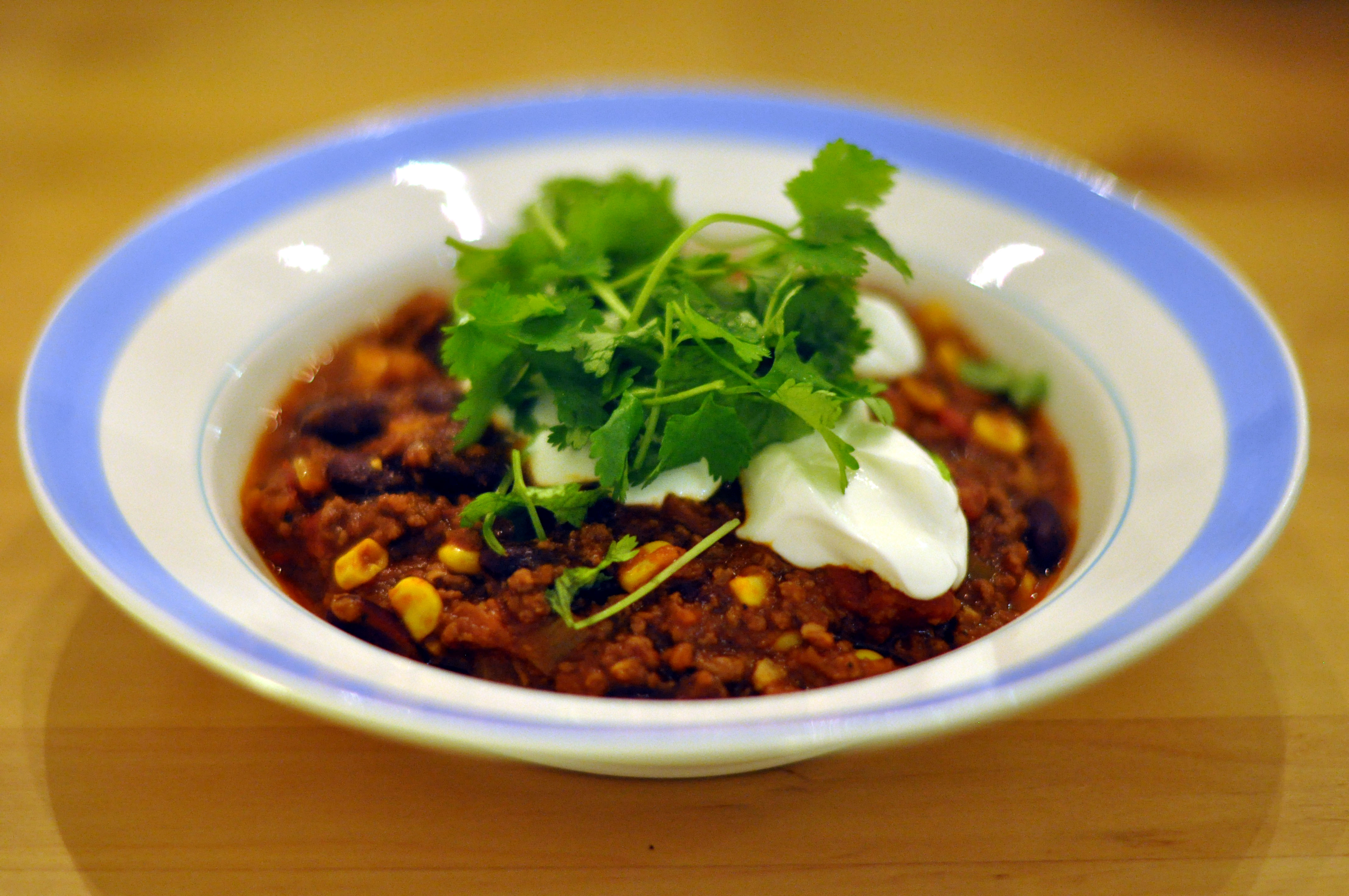
Dishes such as chili con carne gained popularity in the American Southwest and were later aided in their spread across the United States through canning techniques.

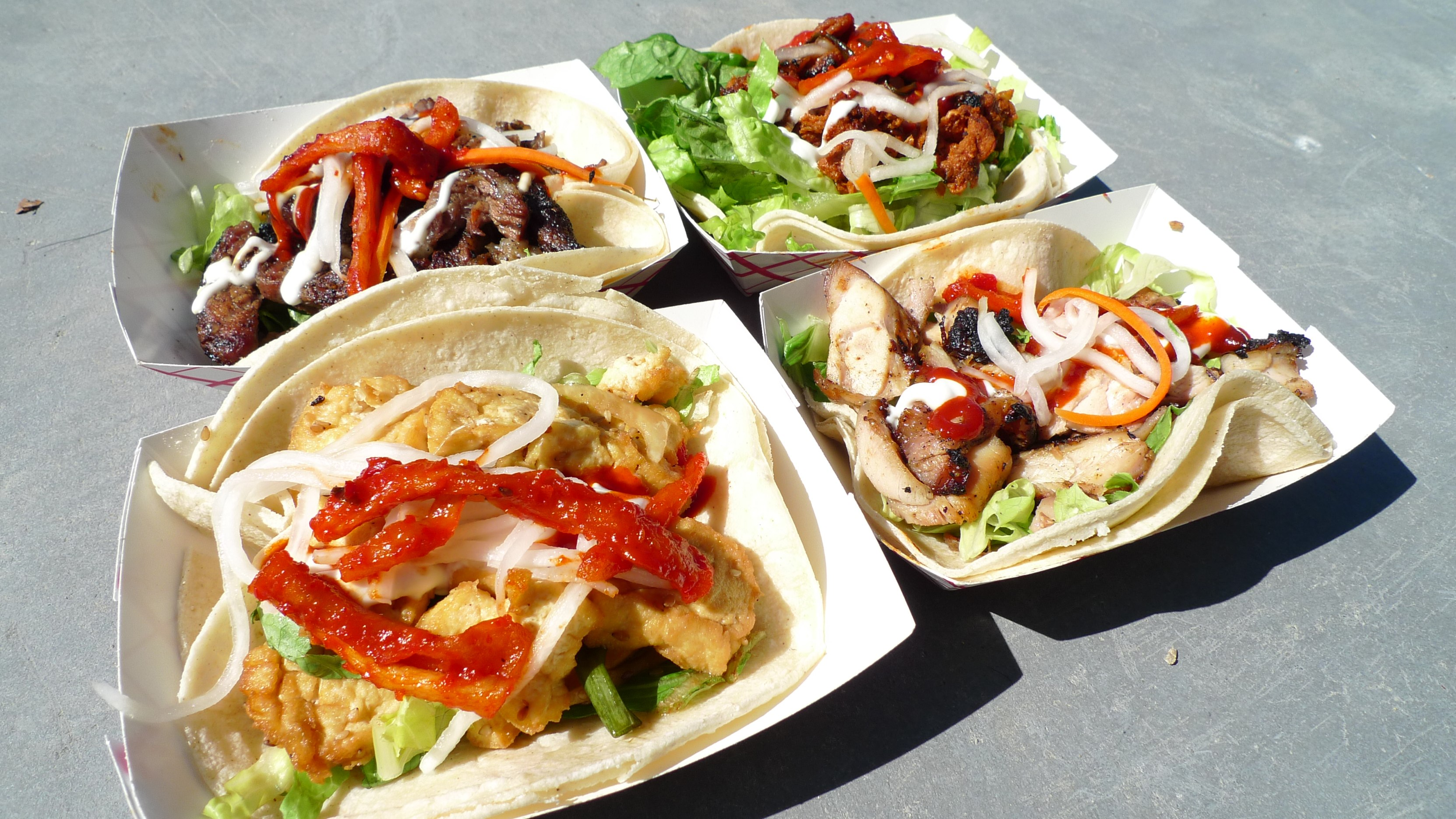
Korean tacos from the "Seoul on Wheels" truck in San Francisco

The territories taken over in the Mexican-American War and the subsequent California Gold Rush brought the first sustained contact between Americans and Mexican recipes, and subsequently American soldiers first came in contact with Mexican flavors during military endeavors in Texas throughout the 19th century, and some reports indicate that a handful of Mexican staple foods were further popularized during the 1893 World's Colombian Exposition in Chicago. Especially in Texas, dishes such as chile con carne and tamales gained favor with the locals. The former would be marketed by the shortened title of "chili" when canned and dispensed to the larger American public.

Some of Mexican cuisine's entrance into the United States can in part be attributed to the United States' expansion into what was then Northern Mexico as a result of the Mexican-American War and its termination with the signing of the Treaty of Guadalupe Hidalgo in 1848. As the U.S. border crossed many Mexican citizens located in what is now the American Southwest, they maintained their culinary traditions.

Additionally, much of the influx of Mexican cuisine in the United States can be attributed to Mexican migration. Dating back to the 19th century railroad and agricultural industries, Mexican migration has been a key factor in the American Southwest and subsequent labor demands caused those migrant workers to move even farther north to states in the Midwest. Later government programs such as the Bracero Program (1942-1964) led to the temporary employment of millions of Mexican migrant workers, particularly in labor-intensive industries in Southwestern states. With such an influx of migrant workers came an increase in Mexican food in regions that previously experienced little ethnic influence from Mexico.

The impact of Mexican cuisine has also resulted in the development of several iconic American dishes, such as Frito pies, Mission burritos, chimichangas, taco salad, cheese dip, sopapillas, and Margaritas.

== Tex-Mex cuisine ==
Due to increasing globalization, cultural differences are no longer as clearly defined by national borders as in centuries before. An example of this can be seen along the Mexican-U.S. border, in states such as California, New Mexico, Arizona, and Texas. These states, especially along their southern borders, share many things in common with Mexican culture. This is known as "cultural hybridity". This hybridity is a direct result of immigration patterns of the 19th century, when many Mexicans began entering the Southwestern States. Since that time, ethnic Mexican food has risen to be the most popular non-native food type in America. Mexican culinary practices that were brought to the Southwest were quickly combined with the local culture to create a new form of Mexican-style food; this culinary style is now recognized as Tex-Mex. This resulted in a new culinary combination that was originally unique to the American Southwest, but with time has spread to other parts of the U.S. and the world.

=== Mass production ===
With the advent of industrialism and large corporations, many businesses began mass-producing certain foods, particularly those of the Tex-Mex variety. Not only has this made Americanized Mexican food more widely available to Americans, but also to people around the world. Some examples of mass-produced Tex-Mex cuisine include canned chili, a hybridized version of Mexican "chile con carne", as well as packaged tortillas, boxes of pre-cooked taco shells, frozen burritos, packages of pre-made guacamole, bottled salsa, and bottled nacho cheese. Many Americans confuse these foods with authentic Mexican foods. Commercial Mexican food in the United States represents a $41 billion industry. These businesses have loosely incorporated some aspects of genuine Mexican food, but altered them using traditional American ingredients and styles in order to appeal to a wide American consumer base. Many of these companies began in the 20th century, marking a relatively recent spread of Mexican-style foods into mainstream America.

=== American businesses ===
Many companies have capitalized on the American people's fascination with their version of Mexican cuisine. While businesses that produce authentic Mexican ingredients exist in locations near the border, the Americanized versions are much more common in typical grocery stores all across the nation. Many of these companies take on Spanish words or names for their brands, to increase credibility, while many of them are actually owned by large corporations such as Frito-Lay.

Top American Producers of Mexican Food
Company name	Year Introduced	Primary Products
Mission	1977	Tortillas
Pace	1947	Bottled Salsa
La Costeña	1923	Canned Chilies & Beans
Hormel	1891	Canned Chili
Old El Paso	1938	Taco Shells, Spices, Re-fried Beans
Tostitos	1979	Corn Tortilla Chips
José Olé	2000	Frozen Tacos, Burritos, Taquitos
La Victoria	1917	Enchilada Sauce, Nacho Cheese

=== Americanized Mexican food chains ===
"Mexican" restaurants make up a fairly large portion of the restaurant industry in the United States. Many of the most popular restaurants are large chains that have locations across the country. The five largest Mexican restaurant chains in America as of 2017, in order, are Taco Bell with 6,446 locations, Chipotle Mexican Grill with 2,364 locations, Qdoba Mexican Grill with 726 locations, Moe's Southwest Grill with 705 locations, and Del Taco with 564. These restaurant chains all represent an Americanized version of Mexican food, with relatively few similarities to original Mexican cuisine. The prominence of these chains continues to grow, but an ever increasing recognition of more traditional Mexican cuisine has also been evident in recent years.

While these hybrid-style restaurants are popular in the United States, the same is not necessarily true in Mexico. Across the border from San Diego is the Mexican city of Tijuana where a healthy desire to preserve traditional Mexican cuisine styles and recipes reigns. Many chefs in Tijuana stick to classic Mexican foods, and intentionally avoid the North-American stereotypes of Mexican food in order to preserve their culinary traditions.

== Rising popularity of original Mexican dishes in the United States ==
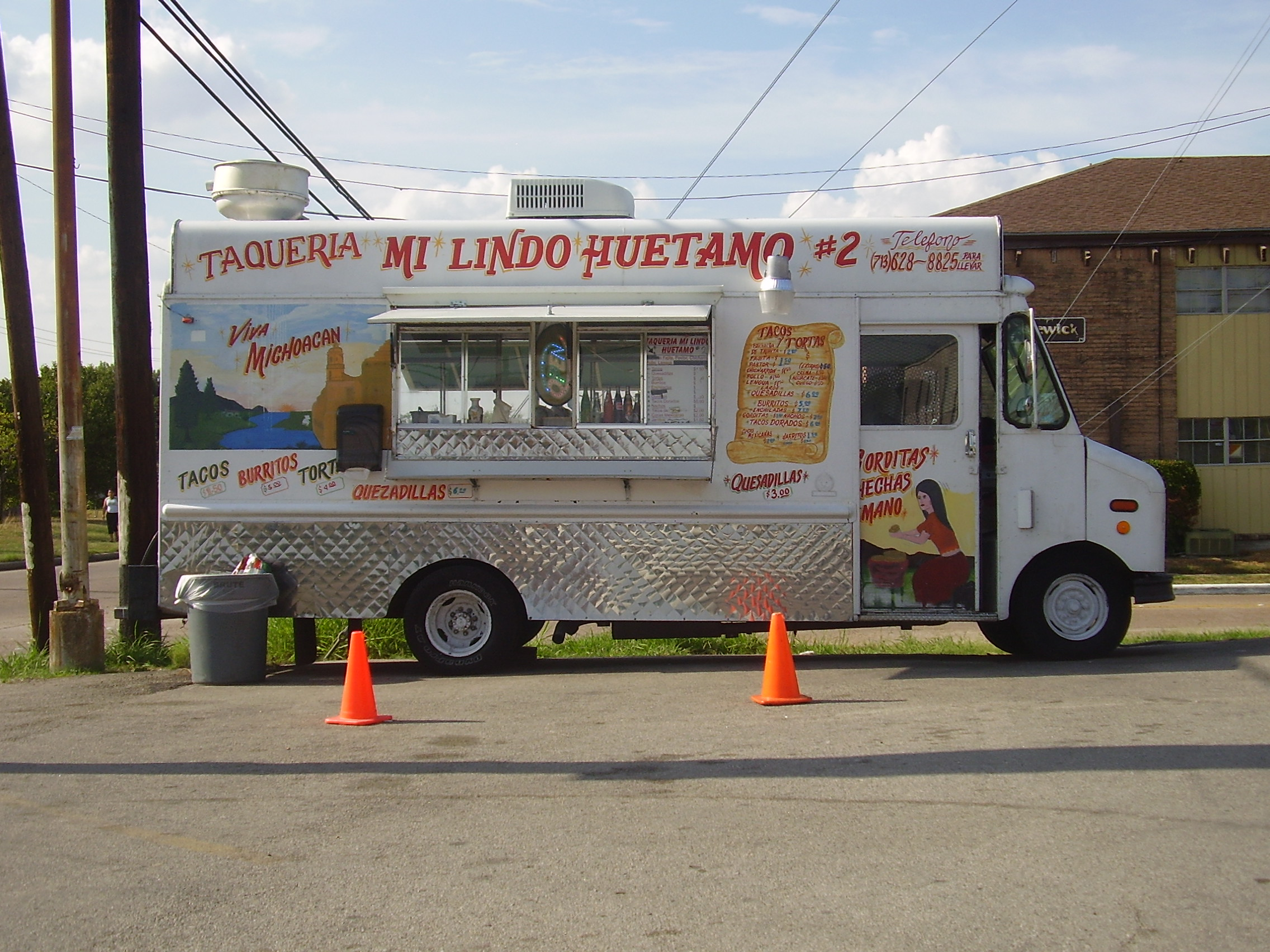
Taco trucks like Taqueria Mi Lindo Huetamo in Houston, TX continue to gain popularity across the United States.

Though Americanized Mexican food is still widely popular, more traditional Mexican dishes have also grown in popularity in the United States. With the emergence of more and more Mexican restaurants, taco stands (taquerias), and taco trucks, many Americans are coming to appreciate Mexican cuisine in its original, less-Americanized form. Additionally, Mexican cuisine is starting to appear in fine dining spheres as a growing appreciation of the flavor potential of traditional Mexican dishes continues to emerge. This represents the trends of the younger generations to favor authentic foods over their more Americanized counterparts. Not only are many Americans seeking out family-run Mexican restaurants that serve traditional dishes, but they are also becoming more interested in learning how to make such dishes in their own homes. Many more recent Mexican restaurants in the United States combine elements of both traditional Mexican cuisine and Americanized Tex-Mex cuisine in their menus.

== See also ==
- Daniela Soto-Innes
- Pati Jinich
- Mexican cuisine
- Tex-Mex
- Tex-Mex cuisine in Houston
- Aztec cuisine
- Latin American cuisine
- List of Mexican restaurants
- Cuisine of California
- Cuisine of the Southwestern United States
- New Mexican cuisine
- Korean-Mexican fusion
