= Búfalo =

Brand of hot sauce and other condiments

- Búfalo Salsa Clasica hot sauce
- Product type: Mexican-style grocery items
- Current owner: Herdez
- Produced by: Herdez
- Country: Mexico
- Introduced: 1933; 93 years ago
- Related brands: Chi-Chi's, La Victoria
- Markets: Mexico, United States
- Website: www.bufalo.com.mx

Búfalo (Spanish pronunciation: [ˈbufalo], 'buffalo') is a brand of hot sauce and other condiments produced by Herdez Group (Grupo Herdez) of Lomas de Chapultepec, Mexico. Búfalo sauce has been produced since 1933. The company produces Búfalo and Tampico sauces, salsas, and other condiments. In the United States, English-labeled bottles are distributed by MegaMex Foods, a joint venture between Herdez and Hormel Foods.

Búfalo comes in several varieties including Chipotle, Jalapeño, and Picante Clasica (chili pepper). Like many Mexican sauces, Búfalo focuses on flavor more than simply on heat. The sauce is thicker than the typical American hot sauce, but not as thick as ketchup—it is close to the consistency of many steak sauces. Búfalo also sells Tampico brand sauces in Chipotle, Original, and Habanero. The sauces come in smaller bottles and are slightly upmarket from Búfalo.

Búfalo is mass-produced and has gained popularity in the United States due to mainstream grocers beginning to carry products once found only in Mexican ethnic grocery stores. Búfalo sauce moved to the shelves of the average grocery and has found a new audience. Búfalo endorses Necaxa, an association football club in Mexico.

== See also ==
- Chili pepper water
- Scoville heat scale
- Condiment
- List of hot sauces
