= Tumbleweed Tex Mex Grill & Margarita Bar =

American restaurant chain

- Type: Private
- Industry: Restaurants
- Founded: 1975; 51 years ago in New Albany, Indiana
- Founders: George R. Keller; Linda Keller
- Headquarters: Louisville, Kentucky, United States
- Area served: Kentucky, Indiana, and Ohio
- Key people: Mathew Higgins (president and CEO)
- Products: Steak, chicken, and seafood cooked in a Southwest Mesquite style
- Revenue: $61 million (2006)
- Net income: $60 million (2006)
- Website: tumbleweedrestaurants.com

Tumbleweed Tex Mex Grill & Margarita Bar (also known as Tumbleweed Mexican Food, and Tumbleweed Southwest Grill & Bar) is a chain restaurant based in Louisville, Kentucky. It serves an American-Mexican cuisine in a combination Tex-Mex and Southwest style. Tumbleweed's menu includes Continental food, encompassing such foods as chicken and steak. The other major style of cuisine is a Mexican-themed menu, including burritos, chimichangas, chili con queso, and house salads.

== History ==
Tumbleweed Tex Mex Grill & Margarita Bar serves Southwest-style foods. George R. Keller and his wife Linda opened the first Tumbleweed restaurant in 1975 in New Albany, Indiana (directly across the Ohio River from Louisville), across the road from New Albany High School, and was originally called Tumbleweed Mexican Food. Then in 1978, Linda converted her parents' Hillside Manor restaurant and bar on Mellwood Avenue in Louisville into a Tumbleweed. This location became the flagship for what was to become a chain of restaurants. In 1994, the restaurant was renamed Tumbleweed Southwest Grill & Bar.

In 1995, the Kellers sold the business to sixty local area investors for US$9.8 million and an additional US$1 million in a clause not to compete against the company's new owners. The company then became a publicly traded company to help fuel its expansion in the Midwest and overseas markets. John Butorac Jr., took over as president of the company, he was also the former vice president for Chi-Chi's.

In 2002, Terrance Smith, CEO of the establishment, was seeking ownership of the company with two other investors. However, on December 18, 2007, Terrance Smith resigned as president and CEO after seven years when the views of the company's board of directors began to diverge from his views. Matthew Higgins became the new president and CEO of the company, with his twin brother, Michael Higgins, as COO. Tumbleweed filed for bankruptcy in 2009. At the time of filing, the firm had 37 company-owned or franchised locations left in the states of Indiana, Ohio, and Kentucky and had one licensed location each in Germany and Kuwait. The company was able to emerge from bankruptcy the following year. Still, the company was not performing as well as it would like and was forced to close 8 out of 32 remaining locations in the tri-state area in 2014 after previously withdrawing from overseas operations. Locations in Illinois and Wisconsin closed in 2008 after the local franchise owner filed for bankruptcy. As of 2024, the restaurant operates 15 locations in Indiana, Kentucky, and Ohio, including company-owned and franchise locations.

== International ==
In 1999, Tumbleweed began to expand overseas and had several overseas locations by 2006. The company had a restaurant on an American Army base located in Vilseck, Germany, that was known for its slow service. All of these locations were closed before 2014.

== Sedona Grill ==
In 2007, Tumbleweed Restaurants decided that it wanted to expand into the upscale restaurant field by opening a separate chain called Sedona Grill with the first location being opened in Lima, Ohio in early 2007. The original plan was to have five locations opened by the end of the year. Ultimately, only one other location was opened, also in Ohio, before the company finally closed the money-losing operation at the beginning of 2008.
