= Molinari's =

Delicatessen in California, United States

Molinari Delicatessen
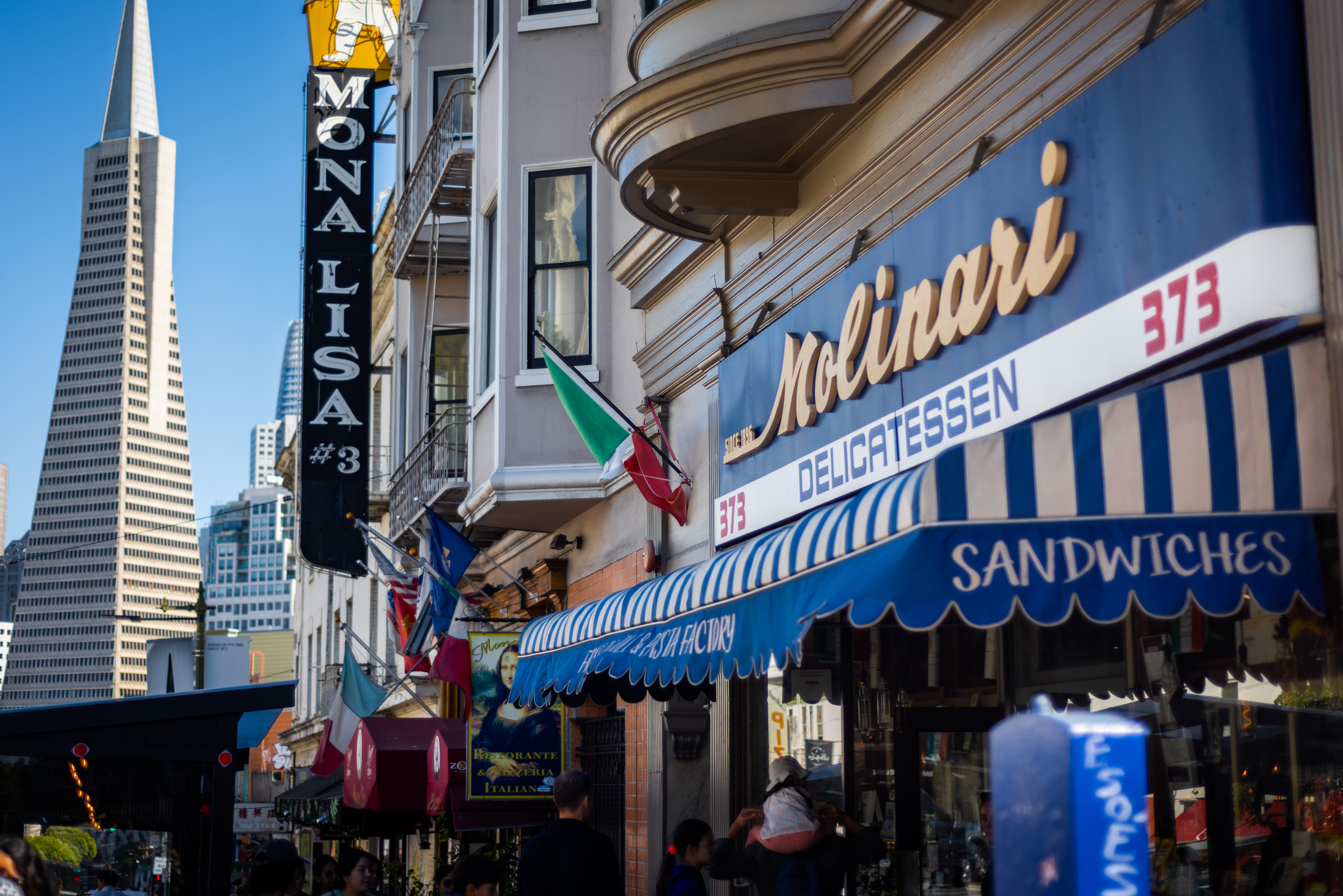
- Exterior of Molinari's. The Transamerica Pyramid is visible in the distance.
- Interactive map of Molinari Delicatessen

Restaurant information
- Established: 1896
- Location: 373 Columbus Avenue, San Francisco, California, 94133, United States
- Coordinates: 37°47′55″N 122°24′28″W

Molinari Delicatessen is a delicatessen in San Francisco, California's North Beach, established in 1896, making it one of the oldest delis in the United States. They make their own brand of salami, as P.G. Molinari and Sons, Inc, which is sold nationwide, and which won a gold medal award in Italy.

== History ==
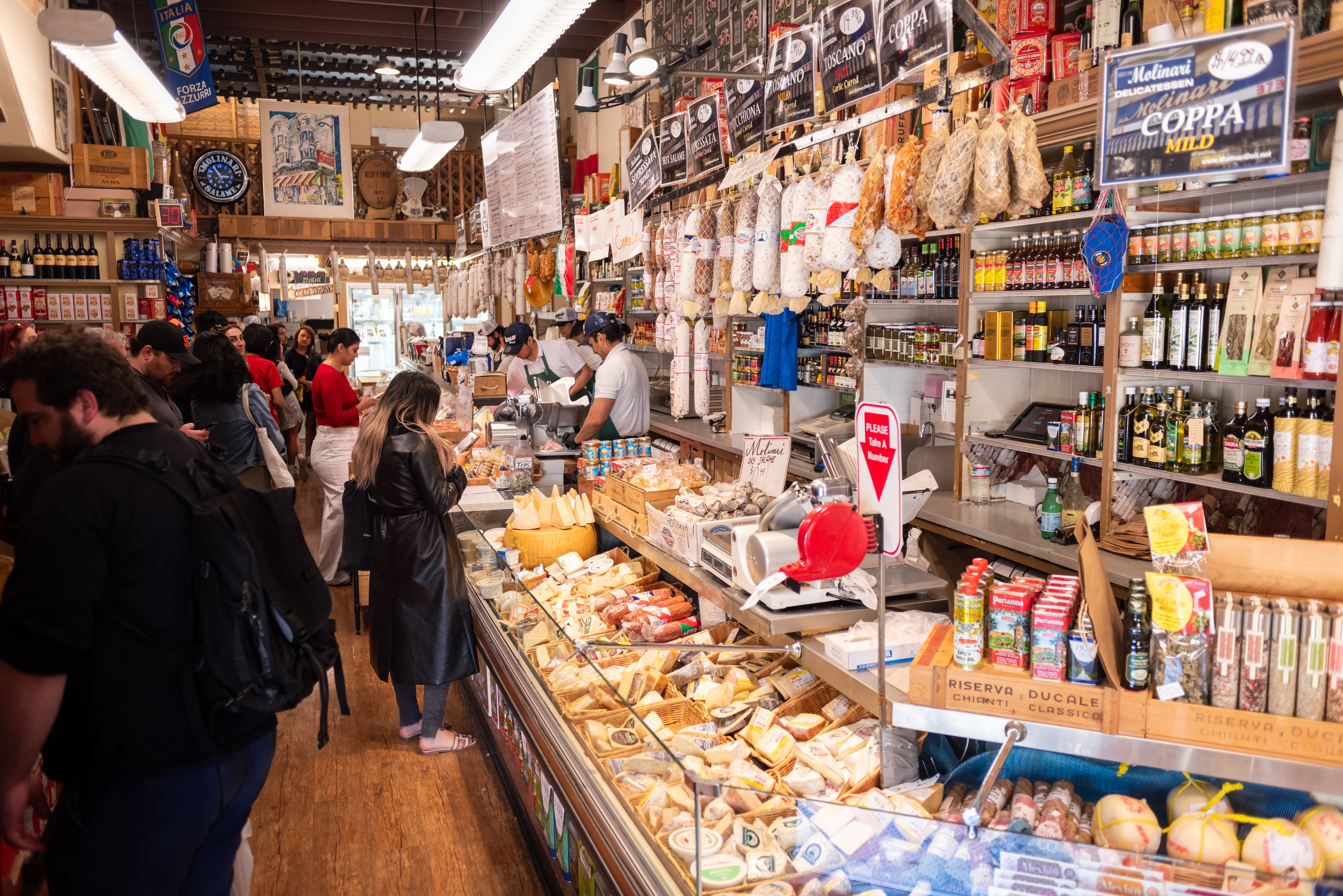
Interior of Molinari's, 2024.

Molinari's was founded by P.G. Molinari, who moved to San Francisco in 1884 from the Piedmont region of Italy. In 1895, one year after getting married, Molinari went into business for himself on Broadway. However, after the 1906 earthquake, he moved his business to 373 Columbus Avenue.

After WWI, his sons, Frank and Angelo, joined Molinari's as business partners.

After P.G. retired in 1950, Frank's son in law, Peter Giorgi, joined. And in 1978 P.G.'s great-grandson, Frank Giorgi, entered after graduating from the University of California, Berkeley.

Besides their own salami, they also have a speciality grocery store, and the deli is known for the Dutch crunch bread.

== See also ==
- List of delicatessens
- Other historic San Francisco Bay Area salame brands:
  - Columbus Salame
  - Gallo Salame
