= Zantigo =

American fast food restaurant chain

- Original Zantigo chain’s logo
- Type: Subsidiary
- Industry: Restaurants
- Founded: 1969; 57 years ago as Zapata in Minneapolis, Minnesota
- Founder: Marno McDermott
- Defunct: 1986; 40 years ago
- Fate: Acquired by PepsiCo and folded into Taco Bell
- Successor: Taco Bell
- Number of locations: 80+ (original chain); 4 (revival chain)
- Area served: United States
- Key people: Marno McDermott (founder)
- Products: Mexican food
- Owner: Heublein (1974–1982); R.J. Reynolds (1982–1985); RJR Nabisco (1985–1986)
- Parent: KFC (1974–1986)

Zantigo is an American fast food restaurant chain serving Mexican food. It began operation in 1969 in Minneapolis, Minnesota as Zapata. With over 80 locations at its peak, Zantigo, alongside its sister/parent company Kentucky Fried Chicken, was sold to PepsiCo, with the former being merged into Taco Bell in 1986. Zantigo was re-established a decade later under new ownership in the Twin Cities market.

== Original Zantigo chain (1969–1988) ==
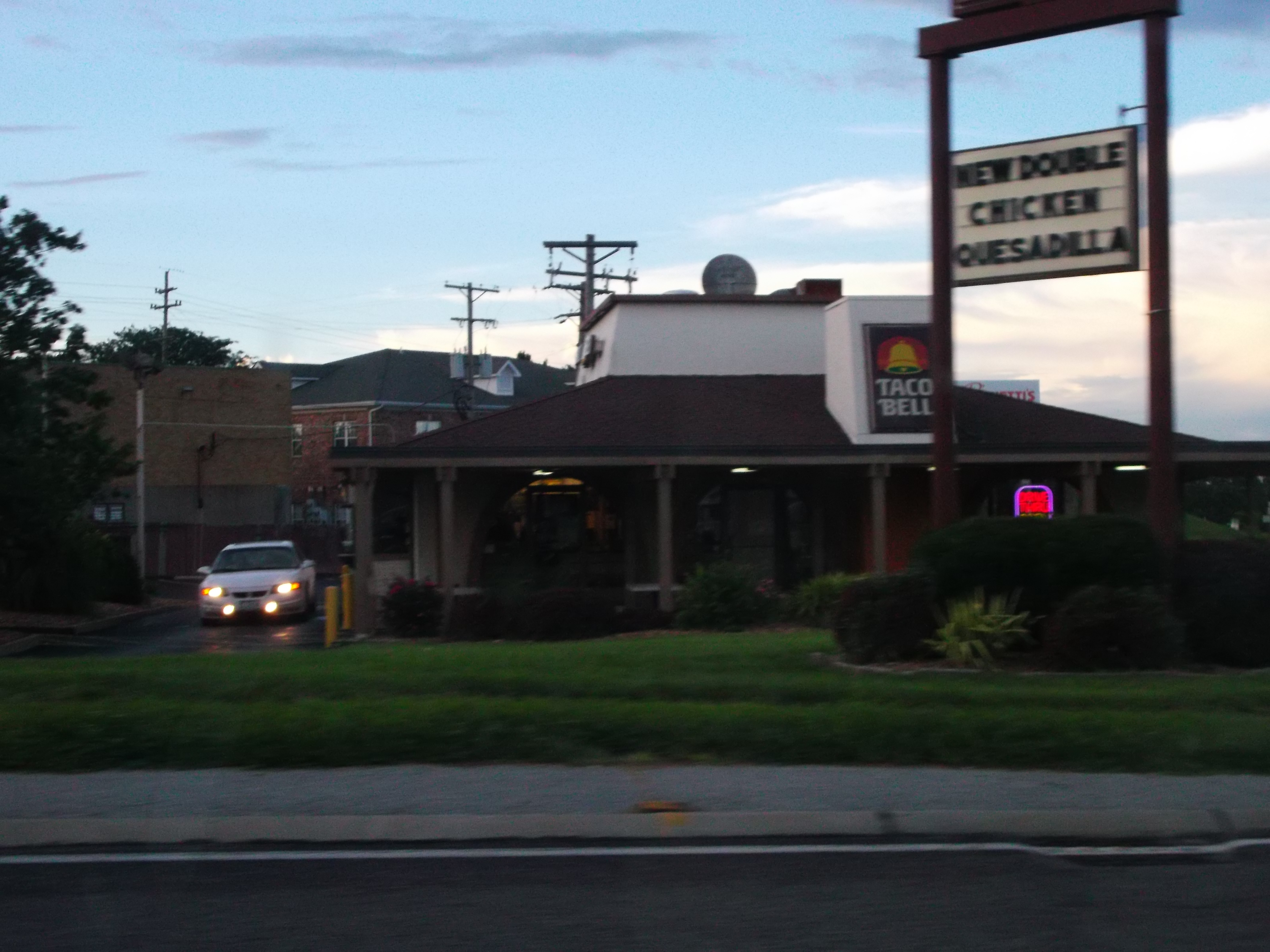
A former Zantigo in St. Louis, Missouri, occupied by Taco Bell in 2013. This location has since closed.

Zantigo was founded in 1969 as Zapata by Marno McDermott, who would later be the co-founder of another Mexican chain, Chi-Chi's. In 1974, McDermott sold Zapata to Heublein, owners at the time of KFC. (Zapata's home Mexican food product line was renamed Ortega at this time.) In 1976, the chain of Zapata Mexican fast-food restaurants was renamed Zantigo. The chain grew rapidly in this period. Television ads for Zantigo featured a Mexican-American narrator with an accent who ended the commercials with the tag line, "Zantigo – you'll be back, amigo."

In 1977, it was reported that average annual sales for a Zantigo location, $300,000, exceeded those for a Taco Bell store, $230,000, and the Louisville-based Zantigo was eager to challenge Taco Bell in the market. But by 1980, KFC had put expansion plans for Zantigo on hold in order to focus on its core Kentucky Fried Chicken business. Heublein was acquired by R.J. Reynolds Tobacco Company in 1982. Following the 1985 takeover by Reynolds of Nabisco, the new company, RJR Nabisco, divested itself of many businesses. In 1986, KFC was sold to PepsiCo for $850 million. Since Pepsi already owned a national Mexican food chain, Taco Bell, the decision was made to close or convert all existing Zantigo restaurants, of which there were 82 as of the October 1, 1986 announcement. The conversion was complete by 1988 and the Zantigo name disappeared.

In many cases, the existing Zantigo stores were in better locations or in better physical condition than nearby Taco Bell locations. So, most Zantigo locations were rebranded as Taco Bell and the nearby Taco Bell stores closed. This led to the Taco Bell chain adopting many of the distinctive Mission Revival-inspired architectural details of the Zantigo design into new Taco Bell restaurant buildings.

Zantigo had several unique menu items, including the Chilito, the Taco Burrito, and Chips 'n' Cheese. Of these, the Chilito was carried over by Taco Bell in former Zantigo markets and was promoted to a chain-wide item, later renamed "Chili-cheese Burrito".

== New Zantigo chain (1996–present) ==
A new Zantigo chain, offering much of the original menu and under new ownership consisting of a former Zantigo manager and his brother, had opened three restaurants in Minnesota by 1996 and currently has four locations in Minnesota: Bloomington, Fridley, St. Paul, and Woodbury. The newest restaurant, an intact former Zapata/Zantigo structure, is on West 7th Street and Davern in St. Paul.
