= Columbus Craft Meats =

American food company

- Type: Private
- Industry: Food processing
- Founded: 1917
- Founders: Peter Domenici; Enrico Parducci
- Headquarters: Hayward, California
- Key people: Joe Ennen (CEO)
- Products: Salami
- Owner: Hormel
- Website: www.columbuscraftmeats.com

Columbus Craft Meats (variously known as Columbus Salame, Columbus Sausage Company, and Columbus Foods, Inc.) is an American food processing company specializing in salami and other prepared delicatessen meats, founded in San Francisco in 1917. Their current headquarters are in Hayward, California. Their products are sold at supermarkets locally and nationwide, including Costco, Safeway, Cost Plus and Trader Joe's. Their artisanal products, including specialty salumi, have been praised by food critics.

== History ==
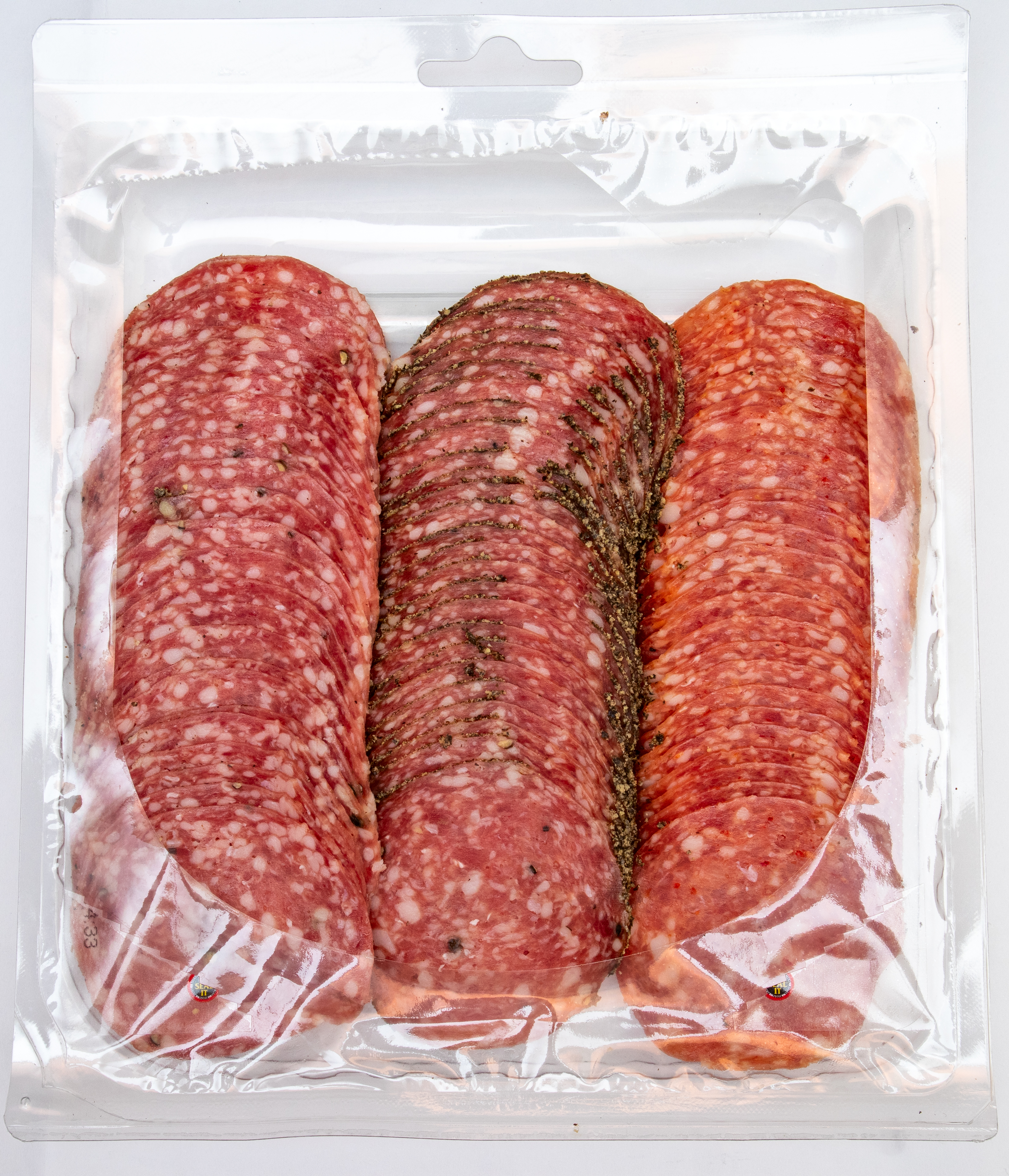
Example of Salami made by Columbus Craft Meats

Italian immigrants Peter Domenici and Enrico Parducci founded what was then the San Francisco Sausage Company in 1917. The company moved its production facilities to South San Francisco in 1967. They introduced deli meats to their product line in 1974. Albert Piccetti was president of the company for 40 years, and died in 1998.

Columbus Salame hired Studio Hinrichs, in association with Pentagram, to revamp their company logo, emphasizing their Italian heritage, including use of the Bodoni typeface.

On August 28, 2009, a leak at their South San Francisco facility sent 200 pounds of anhydrous ammonia into the air, sickening more than two dozen people. The company paid $850,000 in penalties, and agreed to facility upgrades to settle a lawsuit filed by San Mateo County.

They opened a new $31 million processing facility in Hayward in 2011, replacing their former facility in South San Francisco, which had been devastated by a fire.

Endeavor Capital, a private equity firm, acquired majority control of the company in 2006. In 2012, the company was sold to another private equity firm, Arbor Investments. On November 27, 2017, Austin, Minnesota based Hormel Foods purchased the company for $850 million.

== John Piccetti ==
Co-owner John Piccetti has coauthored a book, Salumi: Savory Recipes and Serving Ideas for Salame, Prosciutto, and More, with cookbook author Joyce Goldstein, Charcutier Francois Vecchio, and David Rosengarten.

== See also ==
Other historic San Francisco Bay Area salame brands:

- Gallo Salame
- P.G. Molinari and Sons, Inc
