= Shelly Frank =

United States restaurant executive

Shelly Frank is a United States restaurant executive best known as the former head of the Mexican-restaurant franchise Chi-Chi's, serving as its CEO, Chairman, and President from 1977 to 1986. He was credited as "spearheading Chi-Chi's growth from a single Minneapolis restaurant to a national chain."

Frank was a Kentucky Fried Chicken (KFC) executive when he left to join Chi-Chi's as president and chief operating officer in October 1977. He had also done previous stints at McDonald's and Burger King Frank subsequently became CEO of Chi-Chi's in April 1978 and chairman in March 1982.

By the time Frank left the chain, it had grown to approximately 200 locations, consisting of 120 company-owned outlets and 78 franchise locations. Chi-Chi's replacement was Hal Smith, then-president of Chili's.
