= Frank 'n Stuff =

American hot dog brand

- Course: Entree
- Place of origin: United States
- Created by: Hormel
- Food energy (per serving): 165 kcal (690 kJ)

Frank 'n Stuff was the brand name of a hot dog stuffed with either cheese or chili and sold in the United States from mid-1986 until the 1990s by Hormel, as a variation of the chili dog.

Frank 'n Stuff used Hormel brand chili for the filling and was one of the company's six major product introductions between 1986 and 1987. At the time, the company described the product as "the fun food that features a tunnel of cheese or chili inside a Hormel hot dog". Frank 'n Stuff's eponymous mascot was a friendly Frankenstein-type character and Hormel ran frequent television and print advertisements featuring him.

In 1986, during labor unrest at a production plant, razor blades were found in two packages of the product, but there was no recall.

== See also ==
- List of stuffed dishes
