= Chi-Chi's =

Mexican restaurant chain and food brand

- Product type: Tex-Mex restaurant chain (Europe, defunct; United States (relaunched)); Mexican-style grocery items (United States)
- Current owner: Unknown (European restaurant chain); MegaMex Foods (grocery items); Unknown (United States restaurant)
- Country: Belgium (restaurant chain); United States (grocery items, restaurant)
- Introduced: 1976; 50 years ago (as Mexican-food US restaurant)
- Markets: Europe (restaurants, defunct); United States (grocery items, restaurant)
- Website: chichisrestaurants.com (restaurant); www.salsas.com/chi-chis/ (grocery items)

Chi-Chi's (North America)

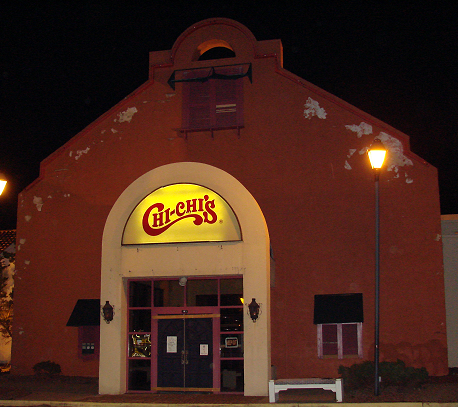
- The front of a shuttered Chi-Chi's restaurant in Alexandria, Virginia (c. 2007).
- Type: Private
- Industry: Restaurants
- Founded: 1975; 51 years ago; Richfield, Minnesota, U.S.
- Defunct: September 18, 2004; 22 years ago (restaurant chain in the U.S. and Canada)
- Fate: Closed (as restaurant chain in the U.S. and Canada)
- Products: Mexican food

Chi-Chi's is a brand of Mexican food grocery products produced and marketed in North America. It was originally the name of an American chain of Mexican restaurants that was founded in 1975 by Marno McDermott and former Green Bay Packers player Max McGee. The owners sold the rights to use the brand's name on packaged grocery products beginning in 1987. The name was also used by a former European franchise through 2024 when its last location closed in Austria.

Following a hepatitis A outbreak in 2003 at a restaurant location near Pittsburgh, the American chain filed for bankruptcy. Its remaining locations were purchased by Outback Steakhouse in 2004, which were either rebranded or sold off. In 2025, Michael McDermott, son of co-founder Marno McDermott, opened a new restaurant in Minnesota, with plans to revive the American chain.

== History ==
Chi-Chi's was a Mexican restaurant chain that was reduced to a single restaurant in Vienna, Austria, by 2022. The company was briefly owned by Tumbleweed, Inc. The chain also once operated in the United States and Canada but exited those countries in 2004, and closed their German and Belgian locations in 2022. The website for the Austrian restaurant was last active in August 2024 and became inactive by November 2024.

Chi-Chi's was founded by restaurateur Marno McDermott (his wife's nickname was "Chi Chi") and former Green Bay Packers player Max McGee. The first restaurant opened in 1975 in Richfield, Minnesota, a suburb of Minneapolis. McDermott had previously founded the Zapata fast-food Mexican chain, which later became Zantigo. From 1977 to 1986, Chi-Chi's was run by former KFC executive Shelly Frank. When Frank took leadership, the chain moved its headquarters to his hometown of Louisville. By March 1995, the chain had grown to 210 locations.

In 2001, Chi-Chi's applied for a trademark on the word "salsafication" but was denied by the Trademark Trial and Appeal Board. The company's slogans were "A celebration of food" and, later, "Life always needs a little salsa."

=== Bankruptcy, hepatitis A, and closure in United States and Canada ===
Chi-Chi's last owner while the company was still in business in the United States and Canada was Prandium Inc., which had filed for bankruptcy several times, including in 1993 as Restaurant Enterprises Group Inc. and again in 2002 as Prandium. On October 8, 2003, Chi-Chi's and Koo Koo Roo, another Prandium subsidiary, filed for Chapter 11 bankruptcy themselves. The flagship Chi-Chi's restaurant in Richfield, Minnesota, was put up for sale in October 2003.

In November 2003, a month after filing for Chapter 11 bankruptcy, Chi-Chi's was hit with the largest hepatitis A outbreak in American history, with at least four deaths and 660 other victims of illness in the Pittsburgh area, including high school students who caught the disease from the original victims. The hepatitis was traced back to green onions at the Chi-Chi's at Beaver Valley Mall near Monaca, Pennsylvania, about 30 miles (48 km) northwest of Pittsburgh. Chi-Chi's settled the hepatitis A lawsuits by July 2004. At the time the suits were settled, Chi-Chi's had only 65 restaurants, fewer than half of the number of four years prior.

In August 2004, Outback Steakhouse bid $42.5 million for the rights to buy its choice of Chi-Chi's 76 properties, but did not purchase the Chi-Chi's name, operations, or recipes. On the weekend of September 18, 2004, Chi-Chi's closed all 65 of its remaining restaurants. Outback had hoped to convert many of the properties to its own restaurants, but instead eventually sold the majority of the properties to Kimco Realty Corporation, a real estate investment trust company in New Hyde Park, New York.

=== Revival ===
On December 3, 2024, it was announced that the restaurant chain would re-launch in the United States in 2025. Michael McDermott, son of original owner, Marno McDermott, would lead and operate the new restaurants as Chi-Chi's Restaurants, LLC. Hormel Foods, the current owner of the Chi-Chi's trademark, has allowed the use of the Chi-Chi's name for the physical restaurant locations. A few months later, McDermott announced that he would convert his two Rojo Mexican Grill restaurants in St. Louis Park and Maple Grove to the revived Chi-Chi’s brand. The first restaurant in the revived chain opened in St. Louis Park, Minnesota on October 6, 2025. The second Rojo Mexican Grill in Maple Grove was closed for good in November 2025 with the previously announced conversion plans being scrapped. No announcements were made about the construction of a possible second Chi-Chi's location. The new menu of the revived concept combined several items from the defunct chain's old menu with items from Rojo's menu.

== Grocery brand ==
In 1987, Hormel Foods acquired the rights to produce and market Chi-Chi's branded salsa and related products in the United States. The venture was producing $60 million annually by 1996. In 2009, Hormel formed a 50:50 joint venture with Mexico-based food manufacturer Herdez Del Fuerte called MegaMex Foods, LLC, to manufacture and distribute Mexican food products in the United States. The Chi-Chi's brand was part of the new company along with other related food brands such as Herdez, La Victoria, and Búfalo brands.

The Chi-Chi's brand is distributed in major supermarkets and discount stores, and it includes salsas, dips, tortillas, tortilla chips, and taco seasoning mixes.

== European franchise ==
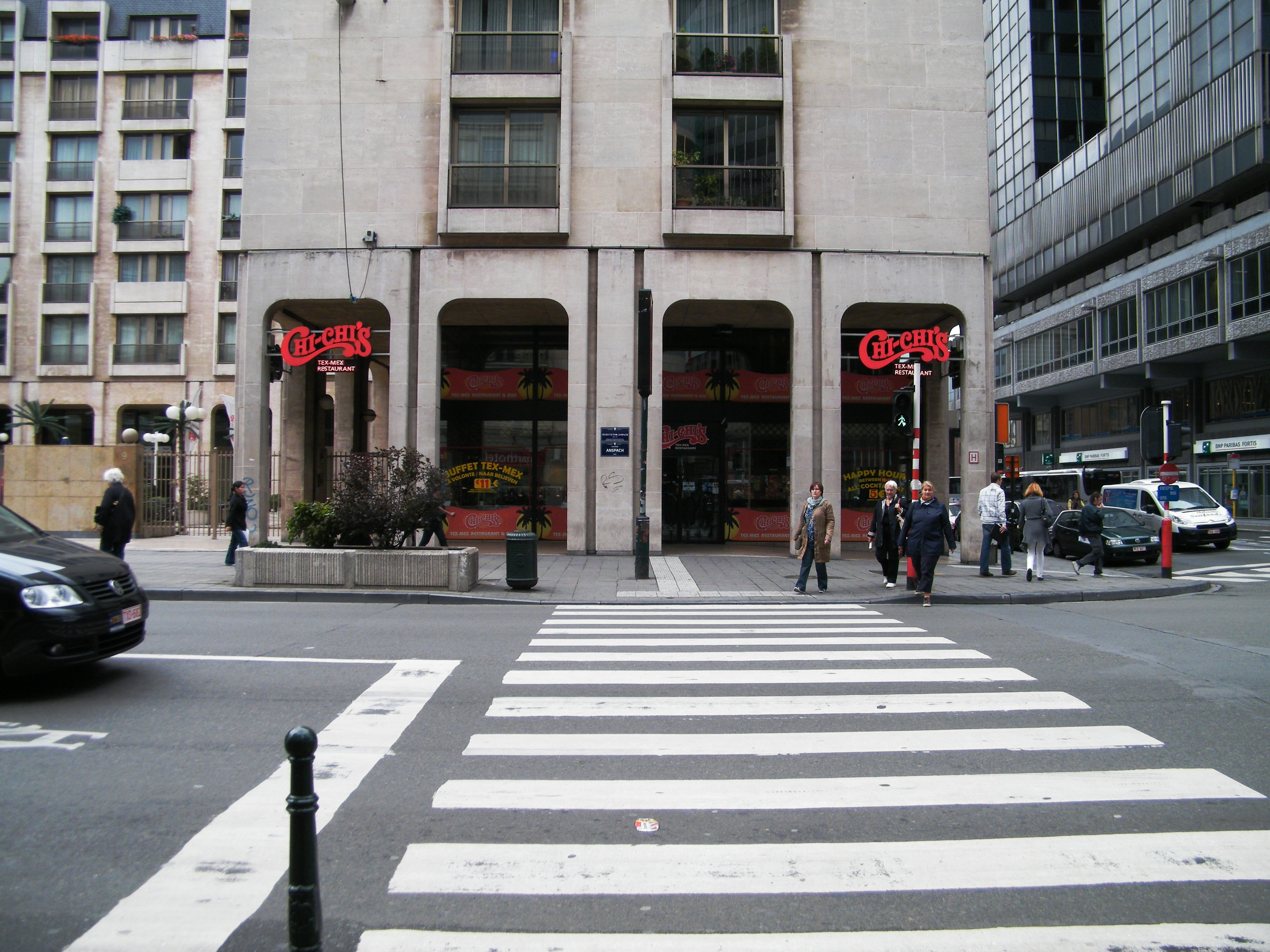
Chi-Chi's restaurant in Brussels (2011)

In 2002, Francis Leroy of Belgium purchased the master franchise for Belgium, and later the master franchises for Europe in 2008, North Africa in 2011, and China in 2012. The European-based company tried to expand into Denmark in 2011 without much success.

In the first half of 2015, the chain in Belgium had to close five under-performing restaurants. Chi-Chi's expanded into Austria by opening their first restaurant in Vienna in 2018.

The European chain's official website in January 2022 listed three remaining Belgium locations, with two in Liege and one in Brugge. The Brugge location announced on Facebook that it was closing in October 2022.

The last restaurant in European franchise closed in 2024 in Vienna.

== See also ==
- List of Tex-Mex restaurants
