= Yellow Leaf Hammocks =

American hammock company

- Industry: Outdoor furniture
- Founded: 2011; 15 years ago
- Founders: Joe Demin; Rachel Connors
- Headquarters: San Francisco, CA, U.S.
- Products: Hammocks
- Website: www.yellowleafhammocks.com

Yellow Leaf Hammocks is an American hammock company established in August 2011. The company focuses on reselling woven cotton hammocks purchased from the Mlabri people of Thailand.

It is a privately owned company, headquartered in California. The founders appeared on Shark Tank in 2020 and received a $1 million investment by Daniel Lubetzky in exchange for 25% of the company.
