= Cy Thomson =

Ransom J. "Cy" Thomson (1886 - 1955) is best known as the man who, between the years of 1911 and 1921, embezzled over $1,000,000 from Hormel Foods in Austin, Minnesota.

In his autobiography he wrote of his status in the community prior to the uncovering of the embezzlement.

"Once my story was written up in magazines as a story of success. It told of a farm boy who came to the city, and by industry and honesty had carved his way to a position of trust and integrity. It told of the leader in the community, the teacher in the Sunday school, of the man who was consulted in every business enterprise. It told of the man who was welcome guest of industrial executives of the state. Governors and high officials were glad to sit at my table."

Thomson was first employed at the Hormel Packing Plant as a scaler in the fresh meat department at $12 per week. In the spring of 1907 he asked Mr. George Hormel for a more responsible job. Hormel suggested that he get training in bookkeeping and accounting. He took a course at Mankato and was reemployed with Hormel. Two years later he was promoted to the position of cashier.

== First theft ==
Early in 1911 Cy committed his first theft from the company. A Mrs. Mary Hollinghead from South Dakota mailed in $800 in currency for the purchase of shares of stock. The stock was issued immediately, but the money was placed in transit. It was still in transit 10 years later when the crash came.

== Investing ==
Thomson began to invest in various ventures such as his poultry farm in Le Roy. "Affairs were moving rapidly for me during this period and I purchased the entire D.W. Young poultry stock and equipment from New York state, including a $10,000 rooster, winner of a long string of prizes at the Madison Square Garden." Cy then branched into the dairy business with a 160-acre (0.65 km^{2}) farm between Lansing and Blooming Prairie.

== Demise ==
Jay Hormel first realised that Cy Thompson was stealing from the company. On Saturday, July 9, 1921, Cy Thomson's embezzlement was uncovered. He recalls the event in his autobiography.

"I knew before I started from my desk. The call came from Hormel's office following a mail controversy with a Boston bank. I knew instinctively before I saw Mr. Hormel's grave face and the accusing eyes of his directors. The exposure which I had been fighting for ten years was at hand."

"My first remark when I entered the room was, 'Gentlemen it's all over, the jig is up.' An hour later I went to the company's general journal with one of the Hormel officials and made the last entry I was ever to make on the Hormel books. It was an entry charging R.J. Thomson with $1,187,000 and crediting the various banks where the shortages existed."

Thomson was jailed on Monday, July 18.

== Legacy ==
Cy Thomson was one of the most public spirited citizens in Austin during the years immediately preceding 1921. He provided cigars to the young men leaving for wartime service. If a local civic event needed something extra to make it a success it was Cy Thomson who would find and provide it. His money for benevolences seemed inexhaustible.

After the scandal, the Austin Daily Herald wrote

"Cy Thomson has been the mystery man of Austin. Everyone has asked where Cy got his money. There is great regret and sorrow at his downfall, for he had endeared himself to the whole community by his public spirit and generosity."

A few days later the mood had changed. The Herald said,

"Cy Thomson knew that a crash of the Hormel Company would be disastrous to Austin. No greater crime in the commercial world was ever committed than that of the man whom we have honored and applauded."

== Later life ==
Cy Thomson's wife died during his 9 1/2 years of imprisonment. The governor refused to give him a leave to attend the funeral. When he was released he worked on a farm in the Minneapolis area.
