= Justin's =

American foods brand

- Company type: Subsidiary
- Industry: Food production
- Founded: 2004; 22 years ago
- Founder: Justin Gold
- Headquarters: Boulder, Colorado, U.S.
- Products: Nut butter; Peanut butter cups
- Number of employees: 30+ (2015)
- Parent: Hormel
- Website: www.justins.com

Justin's is an American brand of natural and organic nut butters and peanut butter cups. The Boulder-based company manufactures and markets jars and single-serve squeeze packs of nut butter, along with various kinds of organic peanut butter cups. Justin's peanut butter cups are USDA-certified organic and use Rainforest Alliance Certified cocoa. Both the peanut butter cups and nut butters are distributed through stores such as Whole Foods Market, Wegmans, Sprouts Farmers Market, Starbucks, and Target in the United States.

== History ==
The company was founded in 2004 by Justin Gold, a 2000 graduate of Dickinson College in Carlisle, Pennsylvania. Gold majored in environmental studies, at Dickinson, before he moved to Colorado in 2002. Gold was a vegetarian and active outdoors-man when he began making nut butters for himself to meet his protein needs and fuel his adventures. After countless occasions of roommates eating his protein creations, Gold decided he should sell his nut butters and began selling at the Boulder Farmers' Market followed by Whole Foods Market agreeing to stock his product. Gold initially raised capital from friends and family and officially launched Justin's, named after the labels he used to include on the jars of nut butters he'd make for himself and roommates.

In 2006, Justin's introduced its portable squeeze packs and was the first nut butter brand to market the single-serve squeeze pack. Since then, Justin's has also introduced its organic dark, milk and white chocolate peanut butter cups, as well as several other flavors of spreads, including its chocolate hazelnut butter and maple almond butter. In 2011, the trade magazine Progressive Grocer named Justin's peanut butter cups one of the best roll-outs of 2011.

By 2012, Justin's was selling 25 million squeeze packs and 1.6 million jars of nut butter. Its revenue growth placed Justin's on Inc. magazine's Inc. 5000 list of the fastest growing companies in the country.

By 2014, the company had 30 employees and was generating triple digit growth with its seven flavors of nut butters and three kinds of peanut butter cups.

In 2016 the company self-published a cookbook titled Justin My Kitchen containing over 50 recipes using Justin's products.

In May 2016, Justin's was sold to Hormel for $286 million.

In October 2025, Hormel Foods announced a strategic partnership with Forward Consumer Partners, divesting a 51% majority stake in its Justin's nut butters and chocolate snacks brand. Hormel will retain a 49% minority interest, allowing Justin's to operate as a standalone company. This move is part of Hormel's strategy to simplify its portfolio and focus on protein.

== Philanthropy ==
Justin's is a founding member of the Whole Planet Foundation's Microloan-a-Month program, a foundation established by Whole Foods that supports micro-financing institutions across the globe. Justin's provides a microloan-a-month to an entrepreneur in the developing world.

Justin's has also partnered with Conscious Alliance to promote awareness of severe hunger issues and participates in annual company trips to volunteer on the Pine Ridge Indian Reservation in South Dakota to help support hunger relief efforts.

== Recognition ==
Justin Gold was named Entrepreneur of the Year for consumer products by Ernst & Young in 2013. That same year, Justin's nut butter received a 2013 Clean Choice Award from Clean Eating Magazine. In 2014, the company was included as one of Prevention magazine's "100 Cleanest Packaged Foods." Justin's has also been included on Inc. Magazine’s Inc. 5000 list of America's fastest growing companies, as well as the editors' pick for Gourmet Retailer Magazine and press pick from the Natural Products Expo in 2015.
