= Neuro (gum) =

American chewing gum and mints brand

- Product type: Chewing gum Mints
- Current owner: Neuro Inc.
- Country: United States
- Introduced: 2015; 11 years ago
- Markets: Confectionary; Caffeinated products Nootropics
- Website: neurogum.com

Ryan Chen and Kent Yoshimura

Neuro is an American chewing gum and mints brand that produces functional chewing gum and mints infused with caffeine, l-theanine, and vitamins. The infused ingredients make the product enhance focus, energy, and mental performance of the consumer. It is targeted at young adults as an alternative to energy drinks.

The chewing gum appeared on the 11th season of the television show Shark Tank, which aired in 2020. The company has recently expanded its product offering to include gums and mints that have different benefits than just energy, including relaxation and sleep aids. As of 2025, it is one of the largest brands in the nootropic edibles industry.

== Background ==
Chewing gum that contained stimulants was first introduced to the United States from R&D products produced by the military at the Walter Reed Army Institute of Research. Products aimed at keeping soldiers both alert and awake were tested in the 1990s, with each piece of "Stay Alert gum" containing 100mg of caffeine. Shortly after this, Jolt Cola released an energy gum, with Wrigley's Alert another getting released in 2013.

Kent Yoshimura and Ryan Chen co-founded Neuro after meeting while studying at University of California, San Diego. Yoshimura was studying neuroscience with Chen studying chemistry, and both are multi-disciplined athletes. They stated in interviews that as college athletes they were dissatisfied with energy drinks and other products marketed as enhancing concentration or performance, but often saw crashes or sugar spikes from products they were using. As a result, Yoshimura and Chen spent time at college creating their own supplements in pill-form, which eventually led to the creation of Neuro. Chen suffered a spinal-cord injury in 2009 after UC San Diego, and went viral in 2013 when he crowd surfed in his wheelchair to a Young the Giant's song, My Body.

== Foundation ==
Yoshimura and Chen launched Neuro in 2015 after years of refining the product. During the same year, Chen and Yoshimura came up with the concept of developing a caffeinated gum.

In 2015, the co-founders conducted a seed round on Indiegogo with a goal of $10,000. The campaign reached this target within three days and raised a total of $21,000. They then focused on two sales models for the gum, direct to consumer and traditional retail. Over the next four years, the company grew modestly and by 2018 had a turnover of $1.5 million. The turnover grew further to $3.5 million in 2019, with Chen recognised as part of the Forbes 30 Under 30 that year.

== Neuro on Shark Tank ==
In 2019, Neuro was pitched to the investors on Shark Tank in its 11th season, airing in 2020 on episode 19. In the episode, the co-founders received two offers. The first was from Kevin O’Leary who offered $750,000 for 5% equity, but with a 50 cent royalty on every unit sold until he recouped $1 million. Robert Herjavec offered $1 million for 20% equity initially, then reduced his offer to $1 million for 14% equity after negotiation. The offers were rejected by the co-founders, stating that they couldn't "go that low" for the valuation figure due to existing investors. During the Covid-19 pandemic, the founders setup online training videos to continue its marketing within the wellness industry.

Neuro was headquartered in Los Angeles from its foundation, but relocated its head office to Las Vegas in 2024. In 2025, Neuro made the news after it was frequently mentioned by Joe Rogan on The Joe Rogan Experience podcast across a number of episodes, and also others such as Lex Fridman. It was said to be one of the reasons that made Neuro the fastest-growing brand on TikTok Shop the year prior. The chewing gum brand continued to grow rapidly in 2025, as the second fastest growing company in Las Vegas to feature on the Inc. 5000 for 2025. The co-founders were also recognised with Ernst & Young's Entrepreneur Of The Year 2025 Pacific Southwest Award.

Neuro returned to Shark Tank in Season 17, Episode 13, which aired on March 11, 2026, as part of an update segment, becoming the first company in Shark Tank history to return after rejecting a deal and secure investment on a second appearance. By that point the company was available in more than 20,000 stores nationwide, including CVS, Walmart, and Whole Foods Market. The co-founders also revealed that in the years following their first appearance they had faced a significant lawsuit, and reached out to Daniel Lubetzky, founder of Kind Bar and a former Shark Tank guest, who helped them reach a settlement. In 2026, Lubetzky formally became a partner in Neuro.

Kent Yoshimura and Ryan Chen, Neuro founders, at Shark Tank

== Neuro products ==
Neuro produces a range of functional chewing gums and mints, each formulated with specific nootropic and wellness ingredients targeting different aspects of cognitive health. All products are sugar-free, gluten-free, vegan, and aspartame-free. They are manufactured using a patented cold-compression process, which the company states preserves the potency and bioavailability of active ingredients. Each product line is available in multiple flavors, with periodic limited-edition releases. In 2025, Neuro launched Strawberry Cake flavor in partnership with DJ Steve Aoki.

=== Energy & Focus ===
Neuro's original and flagship product, Energy & Focus gum, was launched in 2015 as the company's first commercial product. It is formulated to provide sustained mental energy and focus without the jitteriness or energy crash associated with energy drinks or coffee, and is frequently cited as a coffee alternative.

Active ingredients:

- Natural caffeine (from green coffee beans): 40mg (or 20mg in the watermelon gum)
- L-theanine: 60mg
- Vitamin B6: 41% daily value
- Vitamin B12: 100% daily value

Available formats, flavors and sizes:

- Gum: peppermint, spearmint, cinnamon, wintergreen, variety pack, or watermelon
  - Pack sizes: 54-piece 6-pack and 90-piece bulk bag
- Mints: peppermint, spearmint, wintergreen, variety pack; sour apple, sour berry, sour citrus and sour variety pack
  - Pack sizes: 72-piece 6-pack and 90-piece bulk bag

=== Extra Strength Energy & Focus ===
Extra Strength Energy & Focus is a higher-potency variant of Neuro's flagship product, designed for more demanding energy and cognitive tasks. It shares the same base formula as Energy & Focus but delivers 100mg of natural caffeine per piece — more than double the standard formula.

Active ingredients:

- Natural caffeine (from green coffee beans): 100mg
- L-theanine: 60mg
- Vitamin B6: 41% daily value
- Vitamin B12: 100% daily value

Available formats, flavors and sizes:

- Gum: peppermint, spearmint
- Mints: peppermint, spearmint
- Pack sizes: 54-piece 6-pack and 90-piece bulk bag

=== Memory & Focus ===
Memory & Focus is a caffeine-free nootropic gum formulated with Cereboost® American Ginseng, a patented, clinically studied extract of American Ginseng (Panax quinquefolius). It contains no stimulants, making it suitable for use at any time of day. It is positioned for consumers seeking cognitive support for memory retention, mental clarity, mood, and reduction of brain fog.

Active ingredients:

- Cereboost® American Ginseng extract: 50mg
- L-theanine: 60mg
- Vitamin B6: 41% daily value
- Vitamin B12: 100% daily value

Available formats, flavors and sizes:

- Gum: peppermint
- Pack sizes: 54-piece 6-pack and 90-piece bulk bag

=== Calm & Focus ===
Calm & Focus is a caffeine-free gum formulated with KSM-66 Ashwagandha® extract, along with vitamins B6 and B12. It is described as an "after-hours" gum, and the company recommends it for relaxation and focus.

Active ingredients:

- KSM-66 Ashwagandha® root extract: 125mg
- Vitamin B6: 0.5mg
- Vitamin B12: 1.2mcg

Available formats, flavors and sizes:

- Gum: berry, tropical
- Pack sizes: 54-piece 6-pack and 90-piece bulk bag

=== Calm & Clarity ===
Calm & Clarity is a mint formulated with GABA, L-theanine, and vitamin D3 to support relaxation, stress reduction, and mental clarity without drowsiness.

Active ingredients:

- GABA: 65mg
- L-theanine: 65mg
- Vitamin D3: 13mcg (33% daily value)

Available formats, flavors and sizes:

- Mints: honey lemon
- Pack sizes: 6-pack (72 pieces) and 90-piece bulk bag

=== Sleep & Recharge ===
Sleep & Recharge is a line of meltaway mints marketed for sleep and nighttime relaxation. The original formula combines melatonin with a herbal blend; Neuro later added a melatonin-free version that uses reishi mushroom, magnesium, and extracts of lemon balm and chamomile instead.

Active ingredients (melatonin formula):

- Melatonin: 1mg (regular strength) or 5mg (extra strength)
- Proprietary herbal blend (25mg): chamomile extract, lemon balm extract, organic passion flower extract, elderberry extract.

Active ingredients (melatonin-free formula):

- Reishi mushroom extract
- Lemon balm extract: 100mg
- Magnesium: 20mg
- Chamomile extract

Available formats, flavors and sizes:

- Mints: mixed berry (melatonin formula); strawberry (melatonin-free formula).
- Pack sizes: 6-pack (72 pieces) and 12-pack (144 pieces) for the melatonin formula; 72-piece pack for the melatonin-free formula.
