= Project N95 =

Project N95 is a nonprofit organization which runs a website devoted to the sale of N95 masks and COVID-19 tests. The website functions as a PPE clearinghouse, connecting buyers directly to manufacturers.

It was founded by Anne Miller. Her mother-in-law was among the first residents of the state of Vermont to die of COVID-19. The nonprofit sold N95 masks for about $1 each. In December 2023, the organization announced it would stop selling masks that month and end operations due to insufficient revenue from donations and sales.
