= La Victoria (company) =

American Mexican food manufacturer

- Product type: Mexican-style grocery items
- Current owner: MegaMex Foods (a joint venture of Hormel and Herdez)
- Produced by: MegaMex Foods
- Country: United States
- Introduced: 1917; 109 years ago
- Related brands: Chi-Chi's, Búfalo, Pace Foods
- Markets: United States
- Website: www.salsas.com/la-victoria/

La Victoria is an American brand of Mexican food products, in particular jar and bottled salsas. It were founded in Los Angeles in 1917, and introduced the first jar salsa product in the US, Salsa Brava, a true Mexican-style salsa, still sold today. In 1941, Henry Tanklage created the La Victoria Sales Company, introducing green and red taco sauce, and enchilada sauces. They are currently a division of Hormel, one of their MegaMex Foods brands.
