= Grupo Herdez =

Mexican food company

Grupo Herdez, SAB de CV

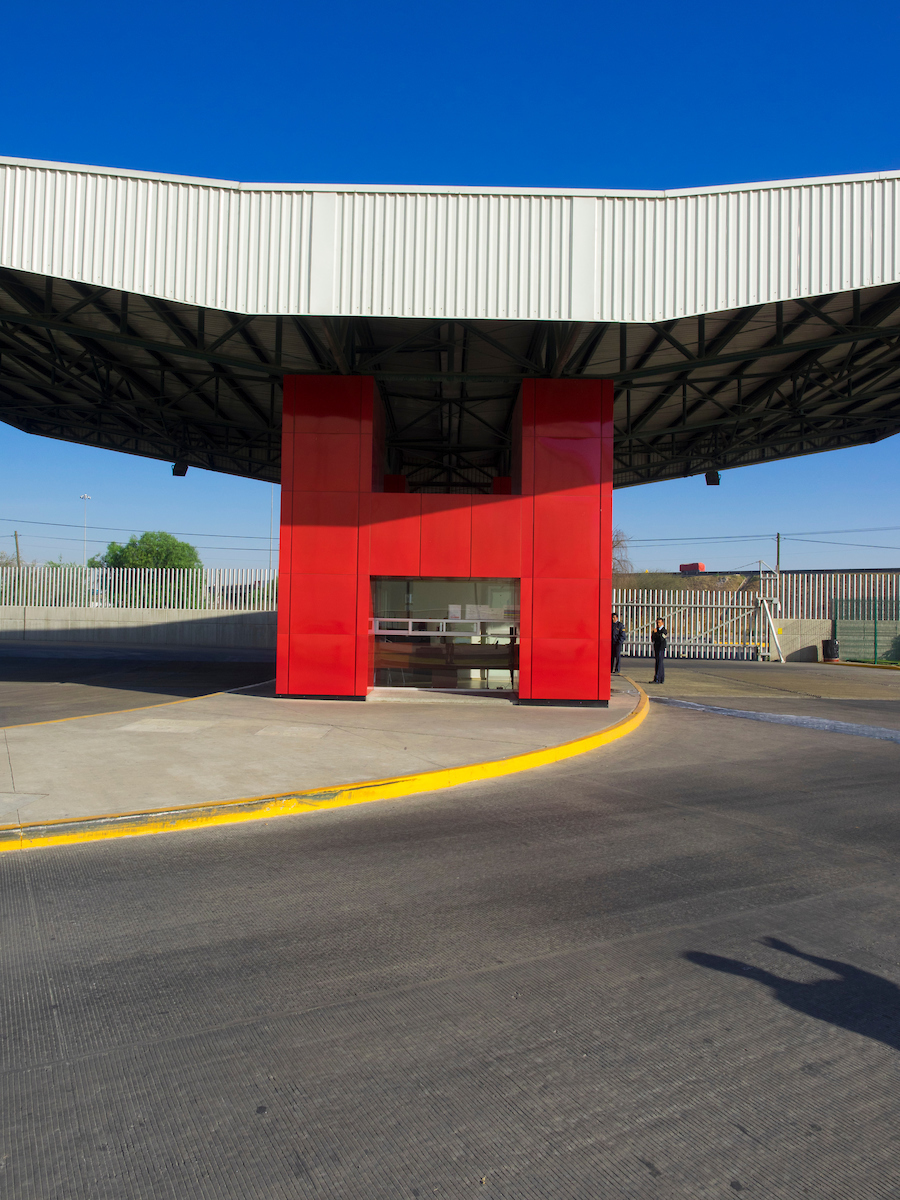
- Headquarters in Mexico City
- Company type: Sociedad Anónima Bursatil de Capital Variable
- Traded as: BMV: HERDEZ
- Founded: 1914; 112 years ago
- Founder: Ignacio Hernández de Castillo
- Headquarters: Miguel Hidalgo, Mexico City, Mexico
- Key people: Héctor Hernández-Pons Torres (CEO)
- Website: grupoherdez.com.mx

Grupo Herdez is a family-owned Mexican food company founded in 1914. After the 1985–1986 Hormel strike, Hormel collaborated with Grupo Herdez to sell Mexican food in the United States. Grupo Herdez also sold Hormel products in Mexico. Since 1991, Grupo Herdez has been listed on the Mexican Stock Exchange.
