= Hormel (disambiguation) =

Hormel Foods is an American food company founded by George A. Hormel.

Hormel may also refer to:

== People with the name ==
- George A. Hormel, founder of Hormel Foods
- Geordie Hormel, American musician
- James Hormel, United States Ambassador to Luxembourg
- Jay Catherwood Hormel, former president of Hormel Foods
