= Konstantinou =

Konstantinou or Constantinou or Kostandinou (Greek: Κωνσταντίνου) is a Greek surname, the genitive form of "Constantine". It is a common name in Greece and Cyprus. Notable people with surname Konstantinou include

- Alex Konstantinou (born 1992), Cypriot footballer
- Andreas Constantinou (born 1980), Cypriot footballer
- Chris Constantinou, English musician
- Clay Constantinou (born 1951), American diplomat
- Fivos Constantinou (born 1981), Cypriot distance runner
- Giorgos Konstantinou (born 1934), Greek actor and director
- Konstantinos Konstantinou (cyclist), Greek cyclist
- Martha Constantinou, Cypriot-American physicist
- Michalis Konstantinou (born 1978), Cypriot footballer
- Nik Constantinou (born 1999), Australian-American football player
- Stavros Konstantinou (born 1984), Cypriot singer
- Tasos Konstantinou (1951–2019), Cypriot footballer, known as "Tasos"
- Vasilis Konstantinou (born 1947), Greek footballer

== See also ==
- Konstantinou kai Elenis, Greek sitcom
