= John K. Menzies =

American diplomat (1948–2022)

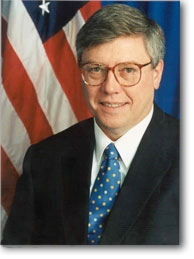
Ambassador John K. Menzies

John K. Menzies (1948 – March 26, 2022) was dean of the Whitehead School of Diplomacy and International Relations at Seton Hall University. Menzies served as President of the American University of Kurdistan. Located in the Duhok Governorate of Iraqi Kurdistan, the university is fast becoming the region's preeminent institution of higher education.

== Biography ==
=== Education ===
The ambassador attended Graceland University before earning his B.A. and M.A. at the University of Arkansas, Fayetteville. He subsequently received a Ph.D. in German from the University of California, Berkeley.

=== Career ===
Prior to appointment at the Whitehead School, Menzies served as the 16th president of Graceland University in Lamoni, Iowa, from September 2002 to August 2006. He resigned on August 5, 2006 in order to return to work in international relations. Menzies was instrumental in attracting more than 300 international students to Graceland University, many from the Balkan states. In January 2006, Menzies traveled to Kosovo to consult on final independence talks taking place in Vienna.

Prior to joining Graceland University as President, he was Chief of Mission at the U.S. Office in Kosovo and served as the United States Ambassador to Bosnia-Herzegovina from January 7 through December 15, 1996.

Menzies served in U.S. Foreign Service posts in Hungary, East Germany, and Bulgaria. He was assigned to the U.S. Mission to the United Nations in New York, and to the office of the Coordinator for the Support for East European Democracy (SEED) program in Washington.

From 1997 to 1999, Ambassador Menzies was a Jennings Randolph Senior Fellow at the United States Institute of Peace as leader of the Balkan working group.

Menzies' previously served as assistant to the dean of the graduate division at the University of California, Santa Barbara. While assigned in Sofia in 1991, he also founded the American University in Bulgaria.

=== Personal life ===
Ambassador Menzies is divorced with three daughters, Lauren, Alexandra, and Morgan. In March 2022, Menzies died at the age of 73 in New Jersey due to a blood clot.

=== Honors ===
Honors include the Department of State Superior Honor Award, an American Bar Association Award for dedication and service toward advancing the rule of law, several honorary degrees, and the Bulgarian Order of the Madarsky Konnik. He also received the Community of Christ International Human Rights Award for the year 2000.

Diplomatic posts
Preceded by Victor Jackovich	United States Ambassador to Bosnia and Herzegovina; 1996	Succeeded by Richard Kauzlarich
Academic offices
Preceded by Rev. Paul Holmes (interim Dean)	Dean, Seton Hall School of Diplomacy; 2007–2013	Succeeded by undetermined
