= Spam =

Spam most often refers to:

- Spam (food), a consumer brand product of canned processed pork of the Hormel Foods Corporation
- Spamming, unsolicited or undesired electronic messages
  - Email spam, unsolicited, undesired, or illegal email messages
  - Messaging spam, spam targeting users of instant messaging (IM) services, SMS or private messages within websites

Spam or SPAM may also refer to:

== Art and entertainment ==
- Spam (gaming), the repetition of an in-game action
- "Spam" (Monty Python sketch), a comedy sketch
- "Spam", a song on the album It Means Everything (1997), by Save Ferris
- "Spam", a song by "Weird Al" Yankovic on the album UHF – Original Motion Picture Soundtrack and Other Stuff
- Spam Museum, a museum in Austin, Minnesota, US dedicated to the canned pork meat product

== Other uses ==
- Smooth-particle applied mechanics, the use of smoothed-particle hydrodynamics computation to study impact fractures in solids
- SPAM, a candidate phylum of bacteria
