= Terrence Blackburn =

American jurist and academic

Terence Blackburn is an American jurist and academic. He has served as dean of the MSU College of Law and Whitehead School of Diplomacy at Seton Hall University.

| Preceded by Creation of office | Dean, Seton Hall School of Diplomacy; 1997–1999 | Succeeded by Clay Constantinou |
