= Paul Holmes (academic) =

American educator

Paul A. Holmes, S.T.D., is a vice-president of Seton Hall University and was Interim Dean of the John C. Whitehead School of Diplomacy and International Relations until January 2007.

== Education ==
A native of Newark and West Orange, New Jersey, Fr. Holmes received a bachelor's degree in sociology from Seton Hall University. He then went on to continue his studies for the priesthood in Italy, receiving three degrees in theology from Roman universities: a Doctorate of Sacred Theology (S.T.D.), magna cum laude, from the Pontifical University of Saint Thomas Aquinas, Angelicum; a Licentiate in Moral Theology (S.T.L.), summa cum laude, from the Pontifical Lateran University; and a Bachelor of Sacred Theology (S.T.B.), magna cum laude, from the Gregorian University.

== Priesthood and teaching ==
Ordained in 1981, Fr. Holmes' first parochial assignment was at St. Matthew's in Ridgefield, New Jersey. After two years, he was assigned to be the parochial vicar of Sacred Heart Cathedral in Newark and, while ministering there, he attended Yale University and earned a Master's in Sacred Theology (S.T.M., 1986), with honors. He returned to Rome for doctoral studies at the Pontifical University of Saint Thomas Aquinas, after which he was assigned to Seton Hall University and was also named associate director of the archdiocesan Worship Office.

After defending his doctoral thesis in 1991, Father Holmes was hired at the rank of assistant professor by the Department of Religious Studies. He was the first director of both Liberal Studies and Social & Behavioral Sciences, two programs in the College of Arts & Sciences. Representing the college in the Faculty Senate, he was elected Vice Chair of the Senate Executive Committee.

While teaching at Seton Hall, Father Holmes helped inaugurate Clergy Consultation and Treatment Service, an interdisciplinary therapeutic outpatient assessment and treatment program for priests at Saint Vincent's Catholic Medical Center in Westchester County, New York, and served as its first spiritual director. In 1998, he earned tenure and promotion at Seton Hall, and was elected Chair of the Religious Studies department.

== Administrator ==
During the 1999–2000 academic year, he attended Harvard University's Management Development Program and was invited to be the first occupant of the Carl J. Peter Chair of Preaching at the Pontifical North American College in Rome.

Returning from his sabbatical, he became associate provost for Academic Administration at Seton Hall and in 2001, became the university's first vice president for Mission and Ministry. In 2002, he led the efforts to obtain from the Lilly Endowment the largest nongovernmental grant ever awarded to Seton Hall. The $2 million award helped establish the Center for Vocation and Servant Leadership.

While Vice President for Mission and Ministry from 2001 to 2005, Father Holmes supervised the new Center, Campus Ministry, the University Chaplain, and the International Institute for Clergy Formation. He was also secretary-designee of the university's Board of Regents.

== Other work ==
Fr. Holmes has published articles in numerous journals, has lectured widely on issues of moral and sacramental theology, and was invited to create This Sunday's Scripture, the first homily service of Twenty-Third Publications in Mystic, Connecticut.

For many years, he has served as the chaplain for the Phi Beta chapter of Phi Kappa Theta, a social fraternity.

For the last four years, he has been the weekend assistant at St. Rose of Lima Parish in Short Hills, New Jersey. In his spare time, he is independent editor of Mary Jane Clark's series of murder mysteries.

Preceded by creation of office	Vice-President for Mission and Ministry, Seton Hall; 2001 - 2005	Succeeded by Rev. Anthony J. Figueiredo
Preceded by Amb. Clay Constantinou	(interim) Dean, Seton HallSchool of Diplomacy; 2005 - 2007	Succeeded by Amb. John Menzies

== Sources ==
School of Diplomacy website
