= Jay C. Hormel Nature Center =

Nature preserve in Minnesota, USA

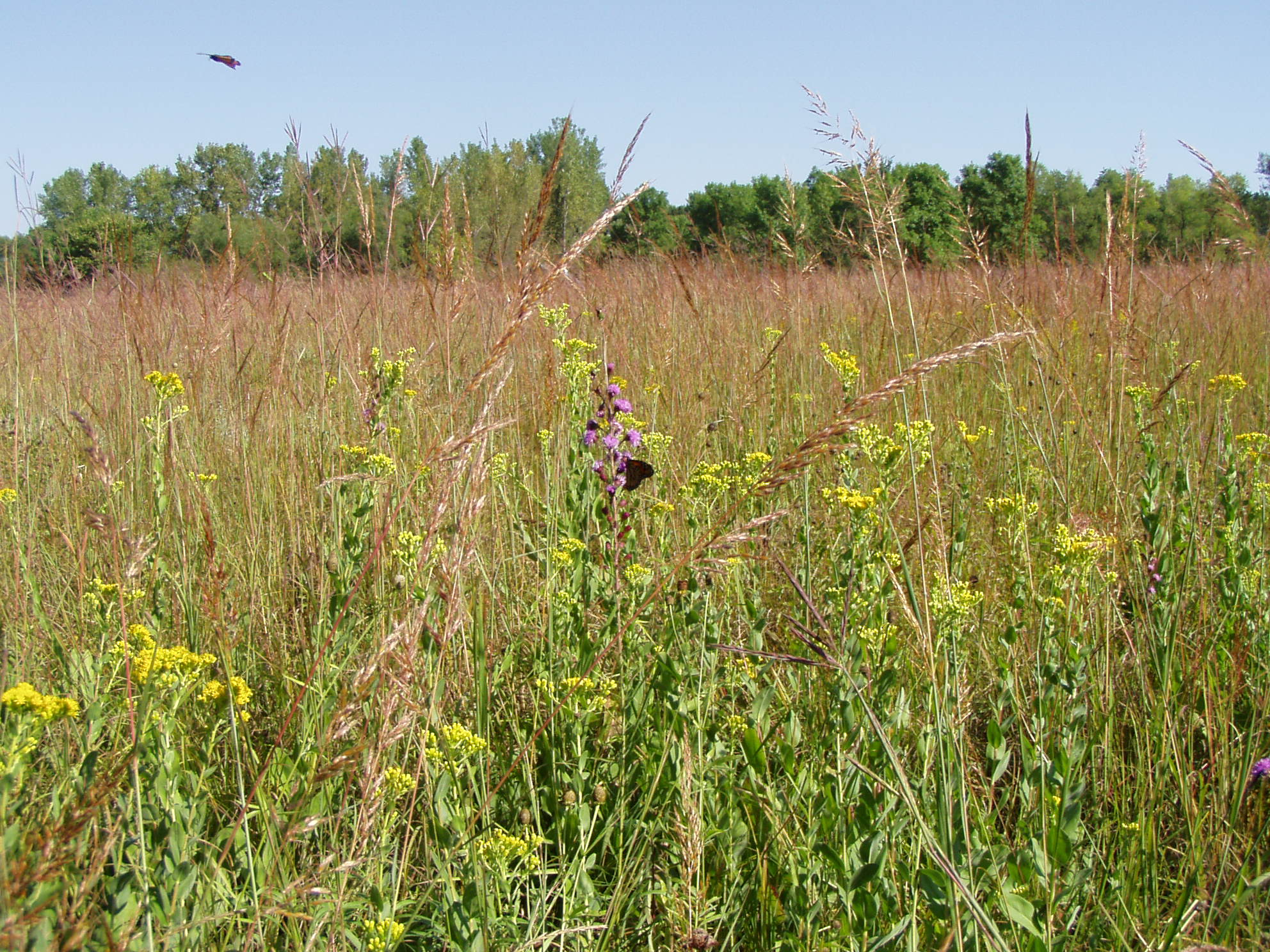
- Monarch butterflies at the Hormel Nature Center

- Location within Minnesota
- Location: Austin, Minnesota
- Coordinates: 43°40′48″N 92°56′11″W

The Jay C. Hormel Nature Center is a municipal nature preserve on the north-eastern corner of Austin, Minnesota, comprising more than 500 acres (200 ha) of restored and remnant prairie, hardwood forest, wetlands and meandering streams. Purchased with municipal, state, and private donations, the nature center is administered by the Austin municipal government through the Parks and Recreation Department. Named in honor of Jay Catherwood Hormel, the son of Hormel Foods Corporation founder George A. Hormel. His private estate forms the original land of the park.

Jay C. Hormel Nature Center features an Interpretive Center, the Ruby Rupner Auditorium, the "big gneiss rock", a Welcome Circle and over ten miles of hiking trails. Along the trails, visitors will find a number of wooden bridges, covered benches and an observation tower that affords a panoramic view of many acres of prairie and forest.

Depending on the time of year, a great variety of wildlife can be viewed at the nature center, including white-tailed deer, mink, salamanders, turtles and many species of birds and butterflies.

== Description ==
=== Trails ===
The Jay C. Hormel Nature Center has over 10 mi (16 km) of hiking trails throughout the more than 500 acres (200 ha; 2.0 km^{2}; 0.78 sq mi) of preserve. The trails are open year-round.

=== Interpretive Center ===
The Interpretive Center features interactive exhibits, with live animals, touch tables, mounted animals, nature puzzles and games, a preschool play area and a children's library.

=== School Programs ===
Hands-on structured environmental education programs are offered to all ages, with an emphasis at grades K through 6. The nature center's primary focus is education, teaching students of many ages to respect, protect and enjoy the outdoors.

=== Equipment Rental ===
Jay C. Hormel Nature Center offers equipment rental during the summer and winter months. During the summer, canoes and kayaks may be rented and visitors can paddle on the pond in the nature center, or down Dobbins Creek to East Side Lake. Winter rentals include cross-country skis and snowshoes. Winter season rentals are dependent on snow conditions.

== History ==
The nature center's history is:

- 1927 - Jay Catherwood Hormel plants the first of more than 200,000 trees in what will become the future Nature Center.
- 1971 - The City of Austin acquires 123 acres (50 ha) of land around the Hormel estate.
- 1975 - U.S. Senator Hubert Humphrey speaks at the dedication of the Visitor Center.
- 1985 - A 125-ton gneiss rock, a glacial erratic, is moved to the Nature Center.
- 1994 - The Ruby Rupner Auditorium is dedicated.
- 2013 - Plans announced for a new Interpretive Center building.
- 2016 - Groundbreaking held for the new Interpretive Center building.
