= Hi-Q (production music) =

Library of production music

Hi-Q was a brand and library of production music produced and distributed by Capitol Records between the early 1940s and late 1970s. It was used in several movies and other productions. Perhaps the most notable work to feature Hi-Q music was the 1968 film Night of the Living Dead. The film's producer Karl Hardman used tracks from the library (some of which had been composed specially for the film), and then enhanced them by adding electronic effects, such as echo and reverb; this was unusual, as, in general, production music libraries only permit synchronization rights. Later, a soundtrack for this film was released by Varèse Sarabande, marking one of the few instances in which production music tracks have been released to the public.

Productions using cues from the Hi-Q library include Dennis the Menace, My Three Sons, The Donna Reed Show, The Huckleberry Hound Show, The Quick Draw McGraw Show, The Yogi Bear Show, The Adventures of Ozzie and Harriet, The Rocky and Bullwinkle Show, Howdy Doody, The Gumby Show, Chespirito, Looney Tunes, and SpongeBob SquarePants.

Hi-Q was released by Capitol on both a series of 12" phonographic records and a set of open-reel audiotapes.

== Notable composers ==
- Harry Bluestone
- Emil Cadkin
- Jack Cookerly
- Ib Glindemann
- Philip Green
- Geordie Hormel
- William Loose
- Spencer Moore
- Roger Roger
- John Seely
- Jack Shaindlin
- Roger Webb
