= The Village (studio) =

Recording studio in Los Angeles

Coordinates: 34.045263°N 118.451472°W

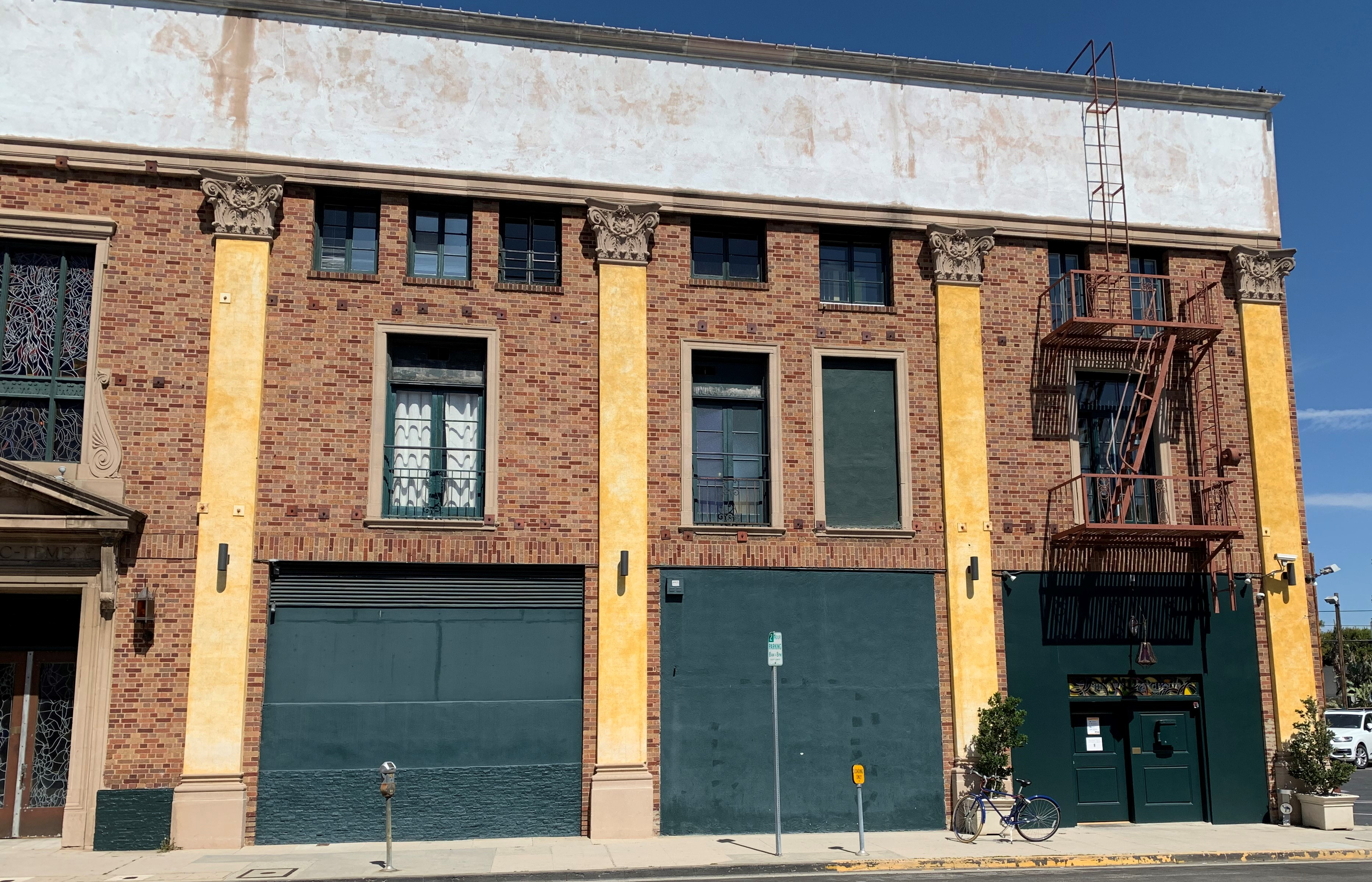
- Exterior of the studio as of April 2021
- Interactive map of The Village
- Location: 1616 Butler Avenue; West Los Angeles, California
- Type: Recording studio

Construction
- Opened: 1922

Website
- villagestudios.com

The Village (also known as Village Studios, Village Recorders, or the Village Recorder) is a recording studio located at 1616 Butler Avenue in West Los Angeles, California.

== History ==
The building was built by the Freemasons in 1922 and was originally a Masonic temple. It remained that way until the 1960s, when Maharishi Mahesh Yogi used the building as a center for Transcendental Meditation.

The temple was converted into a recording studio in 1968 by composer and meatpacking heir Geordie Hormel.

The Village is home to a vintage Neve 8048 console (originally from Universal Recording in Chicago) as well as two Neve 88R consoles. The Village is renowned for its extensive inventory of vintage microphones and outboard gear. The studio also has Oscar Peterson's Steinway & Sons Model L, which Peterson used extensively from the 1940s through the 1980s.

Many major motion picture and television soundtracks have also been recorded at the studio, including Ace Ventura, Dead Poets Society, O Brother, Where Art Thou?, The Rose, The Simpsons, Toy Story 2, Walk the Line, The X-Files, Wall-E, Revolutionary Road, The Shawshank Redemption, Avatar: The Way of Water and others.

The Village becomes home to KCRW's Morning Becomes Eclectic radio show, hosted by Jason Bentley, during on-air membership drives when the station's own performance room is unavailable.
