= Jay Catherwood Hormel =

American businessman (1892–1954)

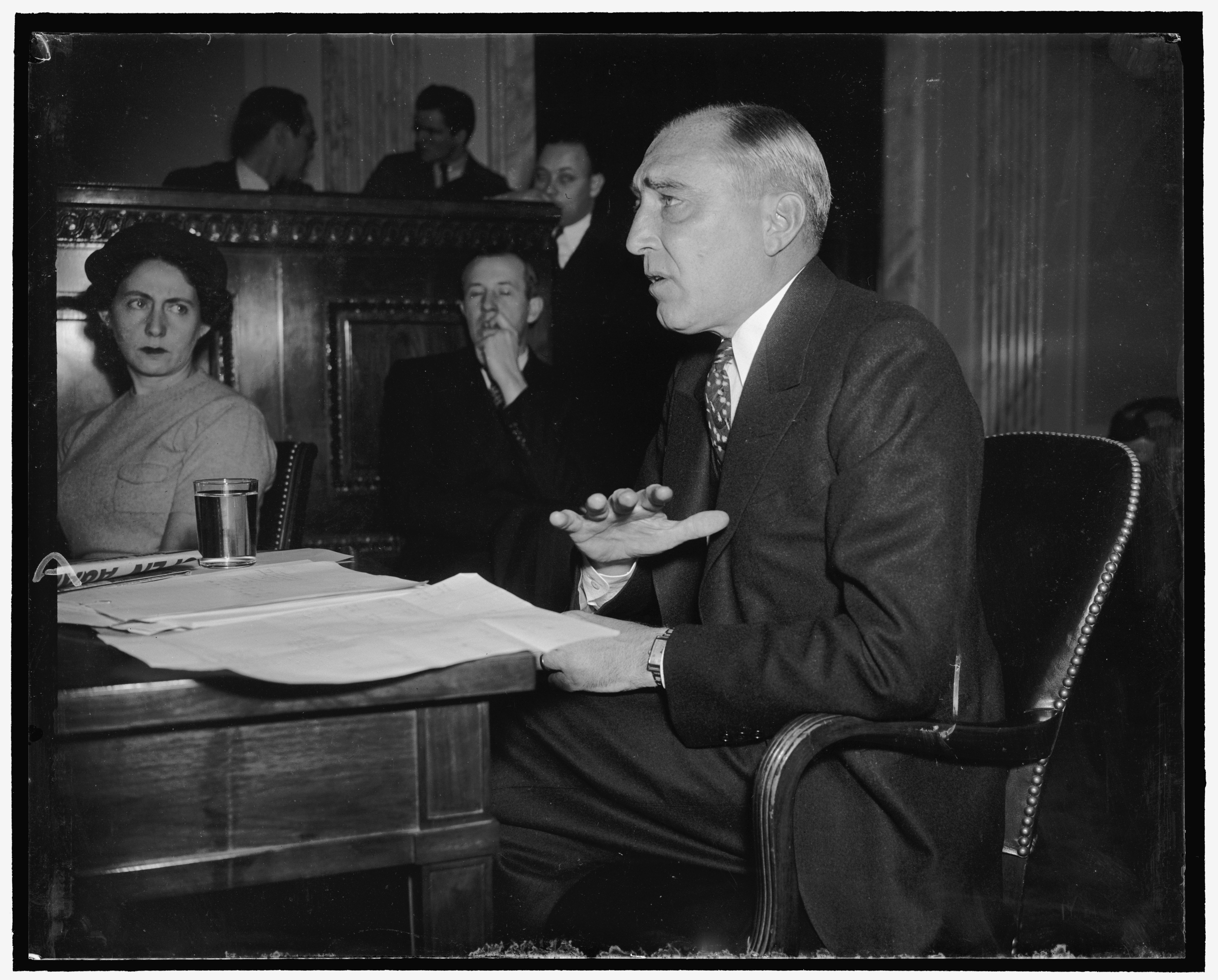
- Testifying before the Senate Unemployment Committee in 1938
- Born: September 11, 1892; Austin, Minnesota, U.S.
- Died: August 30, 1954 (aged 61); Austin, Minnesota, U.S.
- Spouse: Germaine Dubois
- Children: 3, including Geordie and James
- Parent(s): George A. Hormel; Lillian Belle Gleason
- Relatives: Smokey Hormel (grandson)

Jay Catherwood Hormel (September 11, 1892 – August 30, 1954) was the son of George A. Hormel, founder of Hormel Foods, and was head of the company from 1929 to 1954.

== Early life ==
Hormel was born in Austin, Minnesota, in 1892.

== Career ==
In 1914, Hormel left college to work for the Hormel company. He continued to work there with only a brief interruption to serve in the military during World War I. In 1929, he was named president of Hormel. He was a member of the America First Committee prior to the United States' entry into World War II.

== Personal life ==
Hormel married Germaine Dubois in 1922. Hormel had three sons: George Albert "Geordie" Hormel, Thomas Dubois Hormel, and James Catherwood Hormel.

== Death ==
Hormel died on August 30, 1954, in Austin, Minnesota. H.H. Corey was named chairman of the board of Hormel a few months later. Hormel's mansion later became a children's residential treatment center.

== See also ==
- Hormel Historic Home
- Jay C. Hormel Nature Center
