= Geordie Hormel =

American composer and producer (1928-2006)

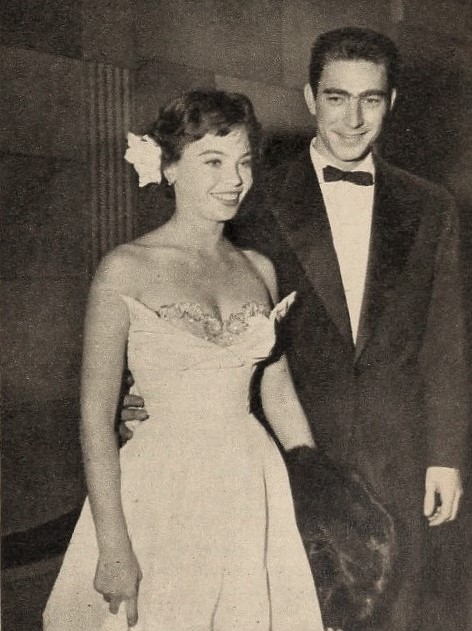
- Leslie Caron and Geordie Hormel, 1951
- Born: George Hormel; July 17, 1928; Austin, Minnesota, U.S.
- Died: February 12, 2006 (aged 77); Paradise Valley, Arizona, U.S.
- Spouses: Leslie Caron (m. 1951; div. 1955) Kim Wadsworth (m. 1957; div. 1961) Nancy B. Friedman (m. 1968; div. 1973) Jamie Renee Vincent (m. 1992)
- Children: 6
- Parent(s): Jay Catherwood Hormel; Germaine Dubois
- Relatives: James Hormel (brother); George A. Hormel (paternal grandfather)

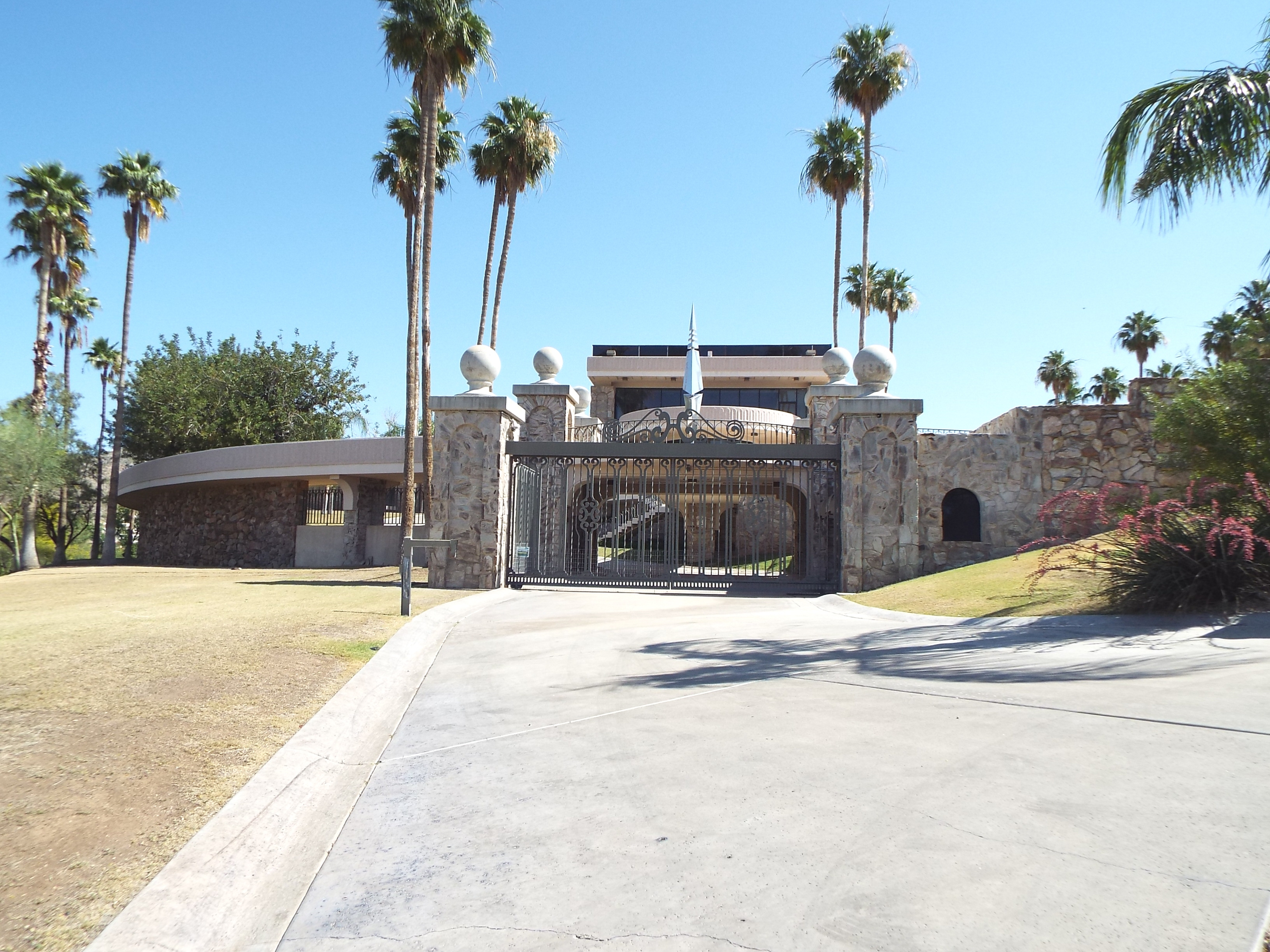
George Hormel's Mansion in Paradise Valley, Arizona.

George "Geordie" Hormel (July 17, 1928 – February 12, 2006) was an American musician and recording studio proprietor.

== Early life and career ==
Hormel was the son of Jay Catherwood Hormel and grandson of George A. Hormel, the founder of Hormel Foods. He claimed to have invented the corn dog when he was a teenager growing up in Minnesota In the 1950s and 1960s, Hormel composed music for numerous television shows including The Fugitive, Lassie, Naked City and The Adventures of Rin Tin Tin. He also sang as part of "The Utility Muffin Research Kitchen Chorus" on Frank Zappa's triple album Joe's Garage (1979). He's also done music for Capitol Records, most importantly the Hi-Q (production music) library.

In 1968 he founded a major independent recording studio, The Village Recording Studio, in Los Angeles, of which he was proprietor until his death. He owned the Wrigley Mansion in Phoenix and the Wrigley Mansion Club housed within it. https://wrigleymansion.com

== Personal life ==
Hormel married four times. He married his first wife, movie actress Leslie Caron, on September 23, 1951. The couple divorced on April 26, 1955. His second marriage was to Kim Wadsworth on March 23, 1957. The couple had two children, and the marriage ended in divorce in 1961. In 1968, Hormel married Nancy B. Friedman, with whom he had one child; they divorced in 1973. Hormel married his fourth and final wife, Jamie Renee Vincent, on June 2, 1992. The couple had two children, and were married until his death on February 12, 2006.

His daughter Geri was featured on the MTV show My Super Sweet 16 in December 2007.

Hormel has two brothers, American composer and environmental philanthropist, Thomas Hormel and Ambassador James Hormel.
