= Hormel Historic Home =

Historic house in Minnesota, United States

- Cook-Hormel House
- U.S. National Register of Historic Places
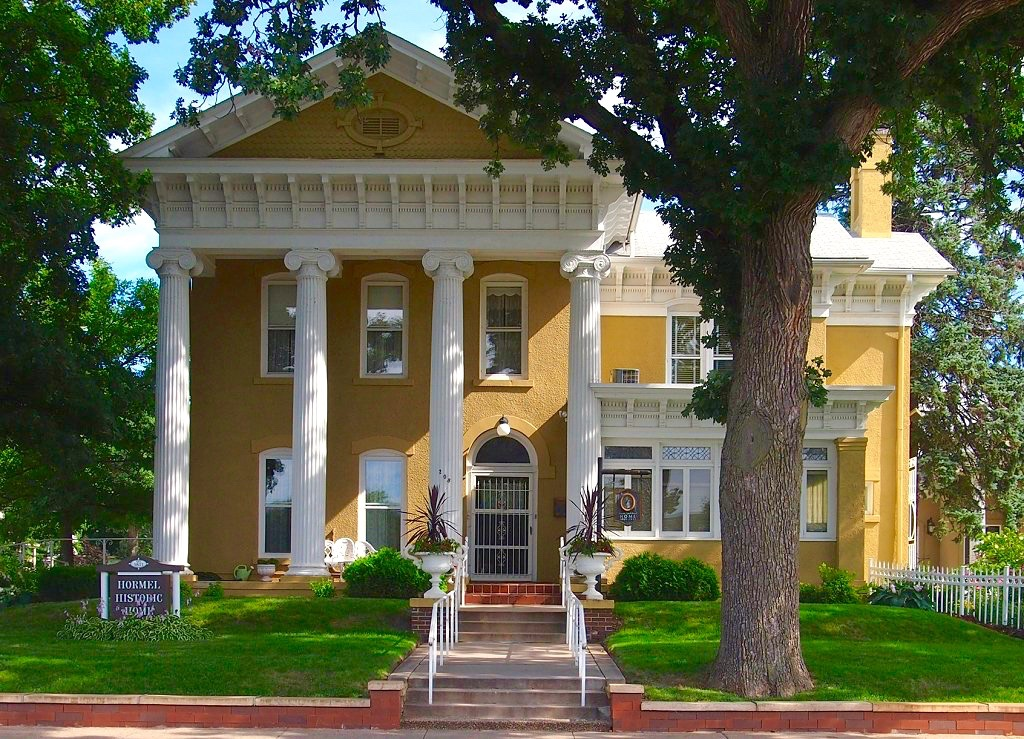
- Facade of the Hormel Home

- Location within Minnesota Location within the United States
- Location: 208 4th Avenue Northwest, Austin, Minnesota
- Coordinates: 43°40′13″N 92°58′37″W
- Area: <1 acre
- Built: 1871
- Architectural style: Italianate (original) and Classical Revival (renovation)
- NRHP reference No.: 82002989
- Added to NRHP: August 19, 1982

The Hormel Historic Home, also known the Cook-Hormel House or simply The Hormel Home, is a historic Italianate style home with Classical Revival facade located in Austin, Minnesota. The home was built in 1871 and was added to the U.S. National Register of Historic Places in 1982.

== History ==
Completed in 1871 by local businessman and politician John Cook, the red brick house was originally built in Italianate style. The home was purchased by George A. Hormel in 1901 and an extensive remodeling project began in 1902. As part of the renovation, the brick was covered with stucco and Classical Revival details were added to the home's interior and exterior. Many of the home's interior furnishings were imported from Europe and Quezal and Tiffany art glass are used on fixtures throughout the home.

Following his retirement in 1927, Hormel and his wife Lillian moved to California, donating the home to the local YWCA chapter.

== Current use ==
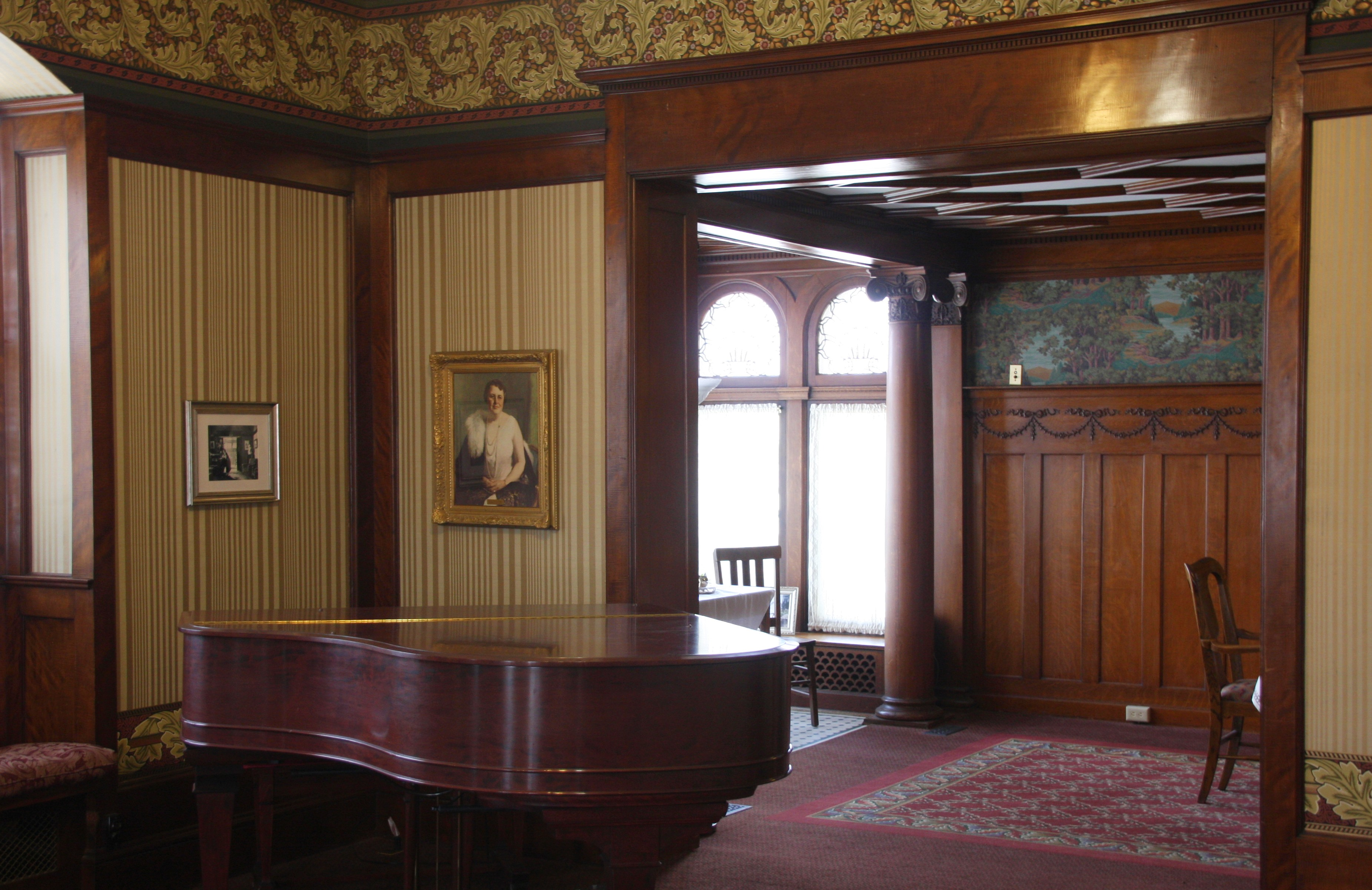
First floor interior

In the early 1990s the home was made into a museum dedicated to the history and preservation of the Hormel family. The home is open to the public for tours. The HHH also offers a variety of educational and arts-related programming including the History Happy Hour, Hearth & Home series, the Harris Piano Contest, and the Peace Garden concerts.

Carriage House Event Center

In 2009, the Carriage House Event Center was added onto the original mansion. This addition is connected to the HHH and includes a large lobby, 200-seat banquet room, and kitchen. The facility is also available for group rentals, and a popular venue for weddings and receptions.

== See also ==
- List of Registered Historic Places in Minnesota
- George A. Hormel
- List of museums in Minnesota
- Spam Museum
