= Spam Museum =

Museum in Minnesota, United States

Coordinates: 43°40′9.5″N 92°58′28.5″W

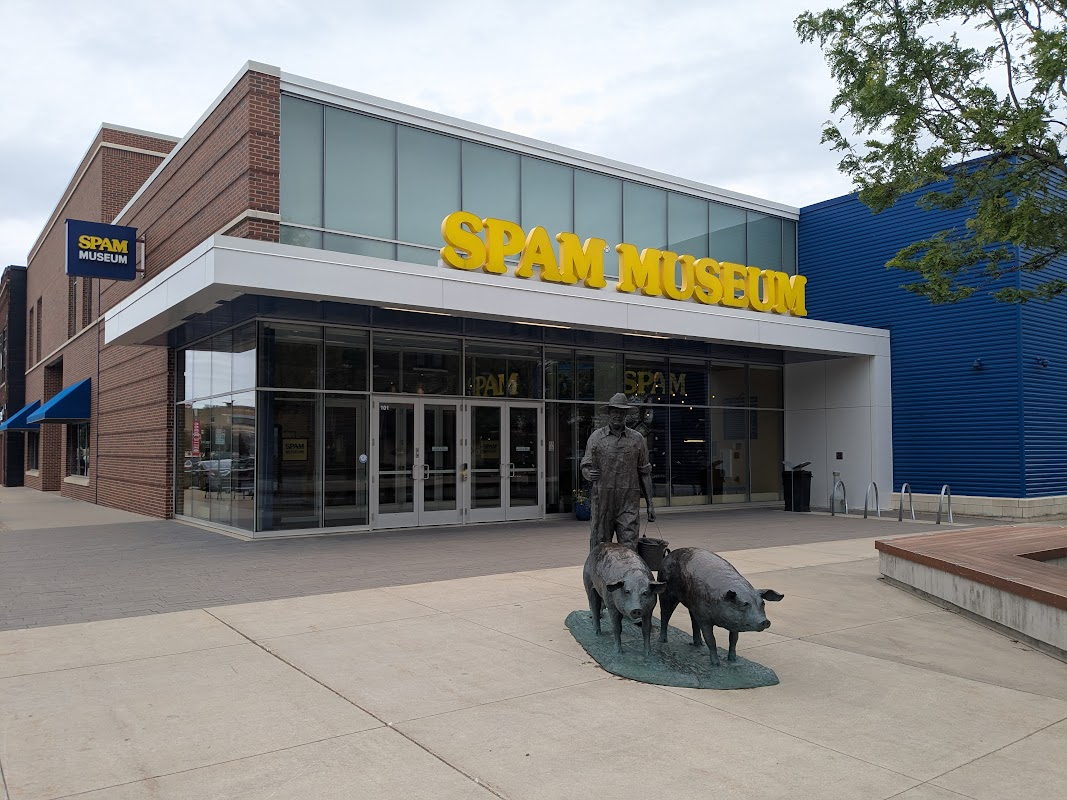
Entrance to the Spam Museum

The Spam Museum is an admission-free museum in Austin, Minnesota, United States, dedicated to Spam, a brand of canned precooked meat products made by Hormel Foods Corporation. The museum tells the history of the Hormel company, the origin of Spam, and its place in world culture.

== History ==
The Spam Museum originated in January 1991 as the Hormel Foods First Century Museum, when Hormel opened a small storefront company museum in celebration of the company's 100 year anniversary. Originally located in Austin's Oak Park Mall, Hormel later re-branded it as the Spam Museum. The mall's interior stores closed at the end of 2014 as plans were developed to redevelop the property. The property was subsequently acquired for redevelopment, with the central portion of the mall planned for demolition to make way for a new Hy-Vee store.

A much-larger Spam-focused museum opened in September 2001. The 16,500-square foot space included a theater, historical displays, family activities and games, and a gift shop. The lobby of the museum featured a wall of Spam with more than 3,300 Spam cans and, for many years, the theatre showed a short film entitled "SPAM: A Love Story." The Spam Museum temporarily closed in September 2014 to move to a new, more accessible downtown location.

== Exhibits and galleries ==
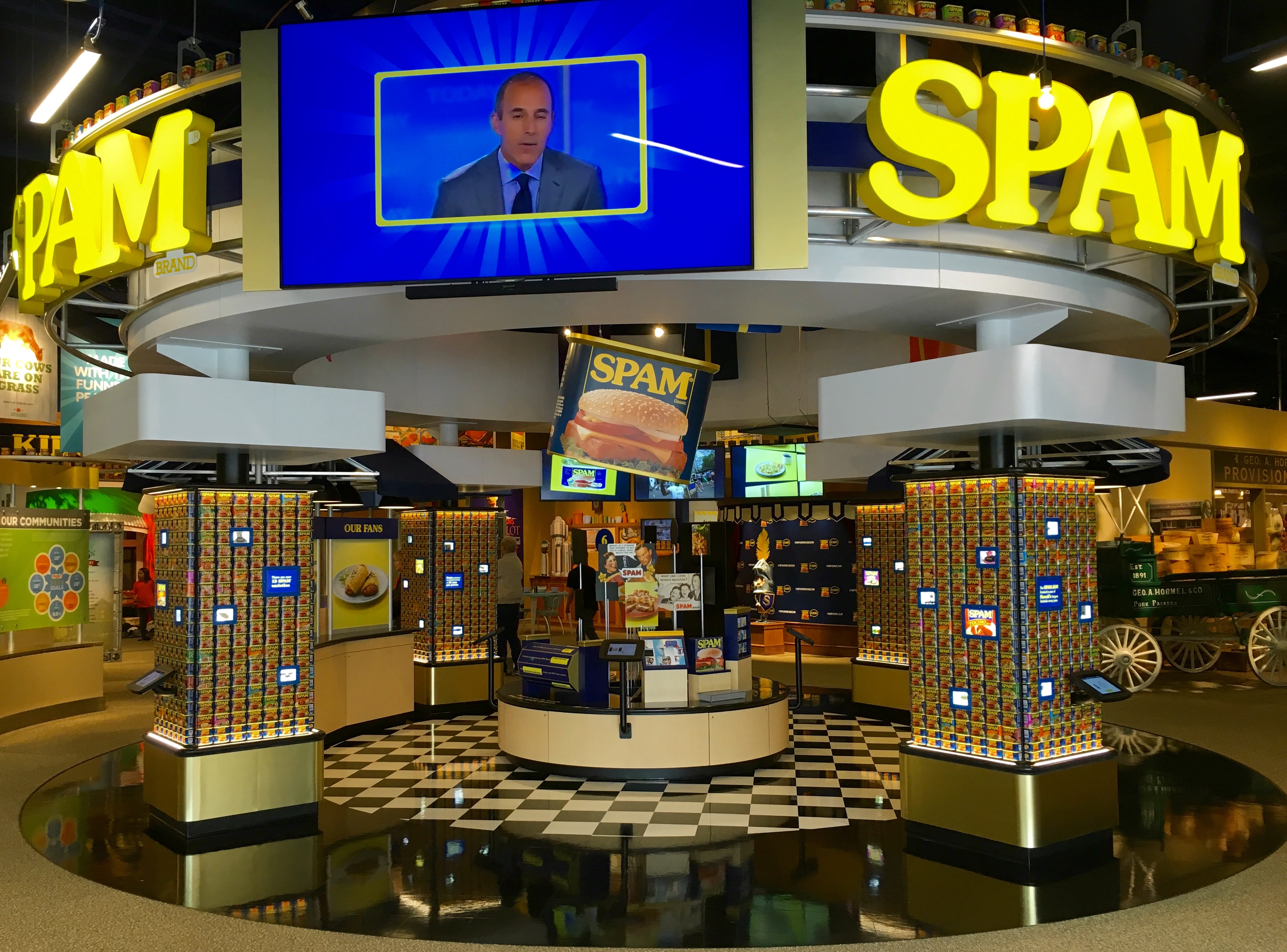
Can Central Exhibit at the Spam Museum

The museum re-opened on 22 April 2016 at its new location at 101 3rd Ave NE.

The location in downtown Austin is approximately 14,000 square feet in size and comprises seven main galleries. These include Can Central, "the heart of the museum"; the World Market, where visitors can learn about the advertising and use of Spam and Spam recipes from 44 different nations; a World War II-themed exhibit explaining the importance of Spam as a staple for American troops; "Spam Products Around the World", an interactive map; the "Can Chronicles" showing the evolution of the Spam can; and Spam Brand 101, an interactive exhibit where visitors learn about 15 varieties of Spam and families are able to compete in the "assembly" of mock cans of Spam. Many of the exhibits include games, interactive videos, and hands-on activities.

The Spam Shop offers hundreds of Spam-branded items and gifts. Volunteer guides – known as Spambassadors – offer visitors small bits of Spam on a toothpick or pretzel stick, commonly known as Spamples.

== Pop Culture ==
The Spam Museum is a featured stop in the Dan Gutman book series Genius Files.

== Gallery ==
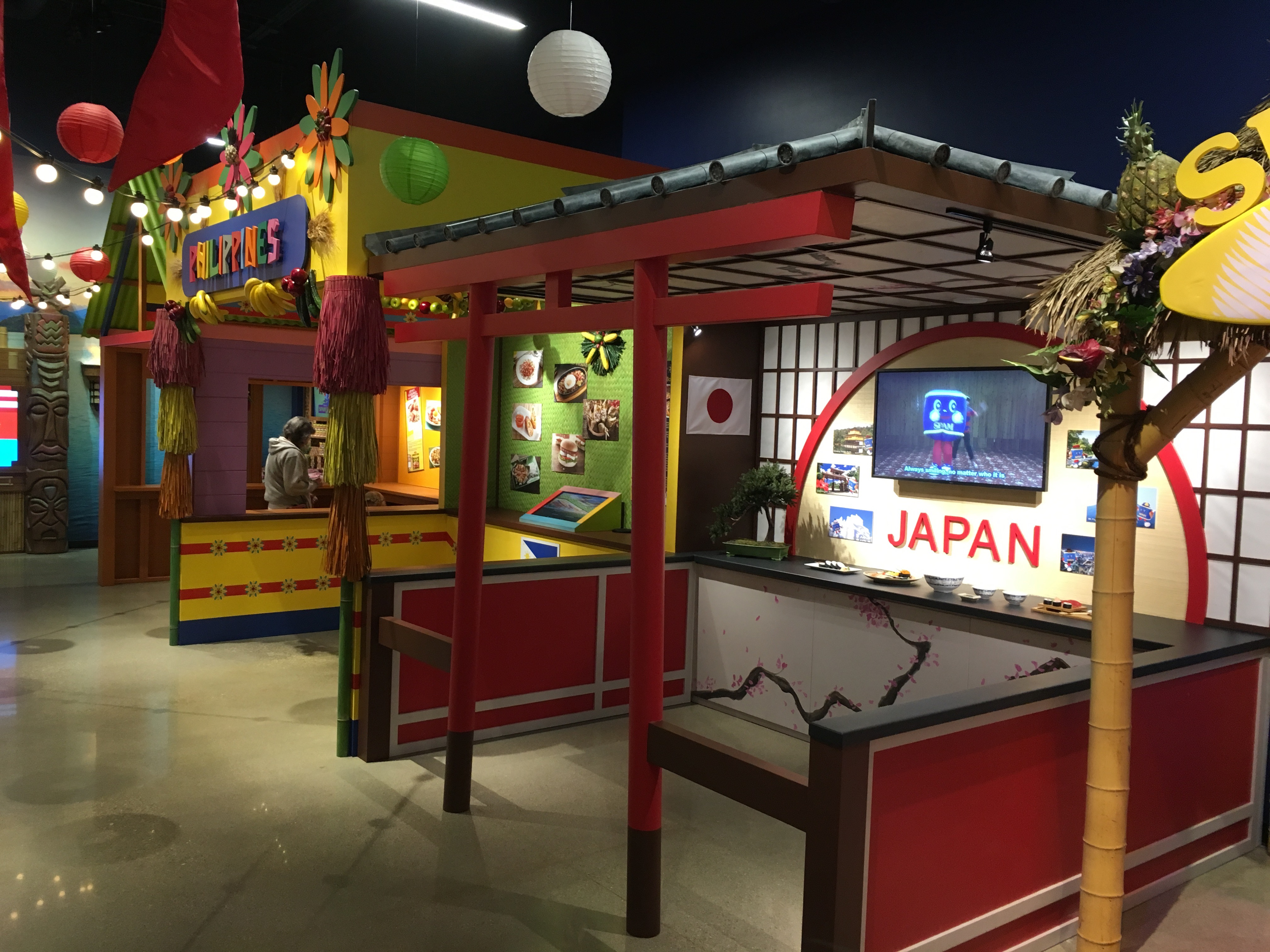
World Market exhibit at Spam Museum

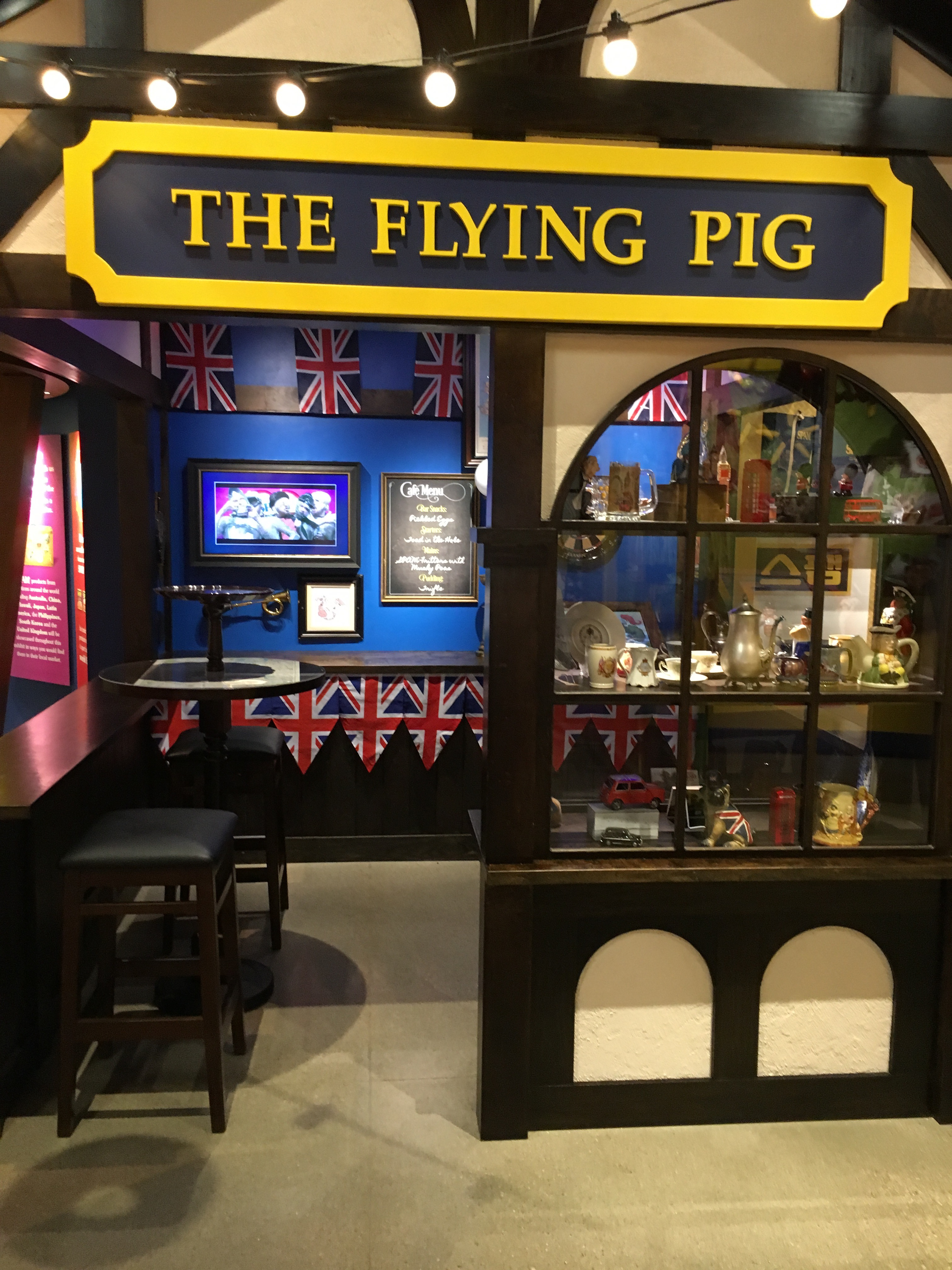
World Market (England) at the Spam Museum

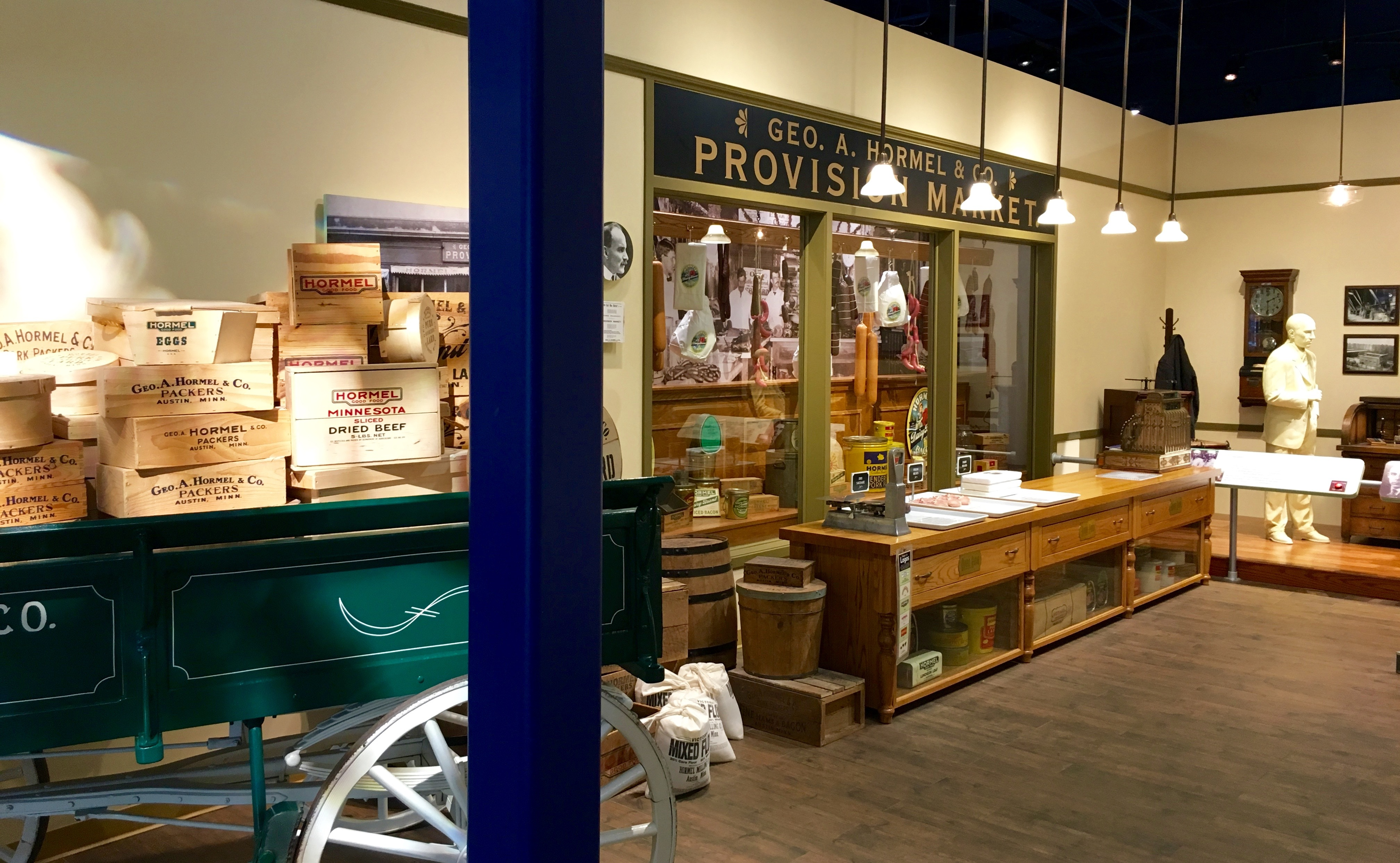
1891 and Beyond exhibit at Spam Museum

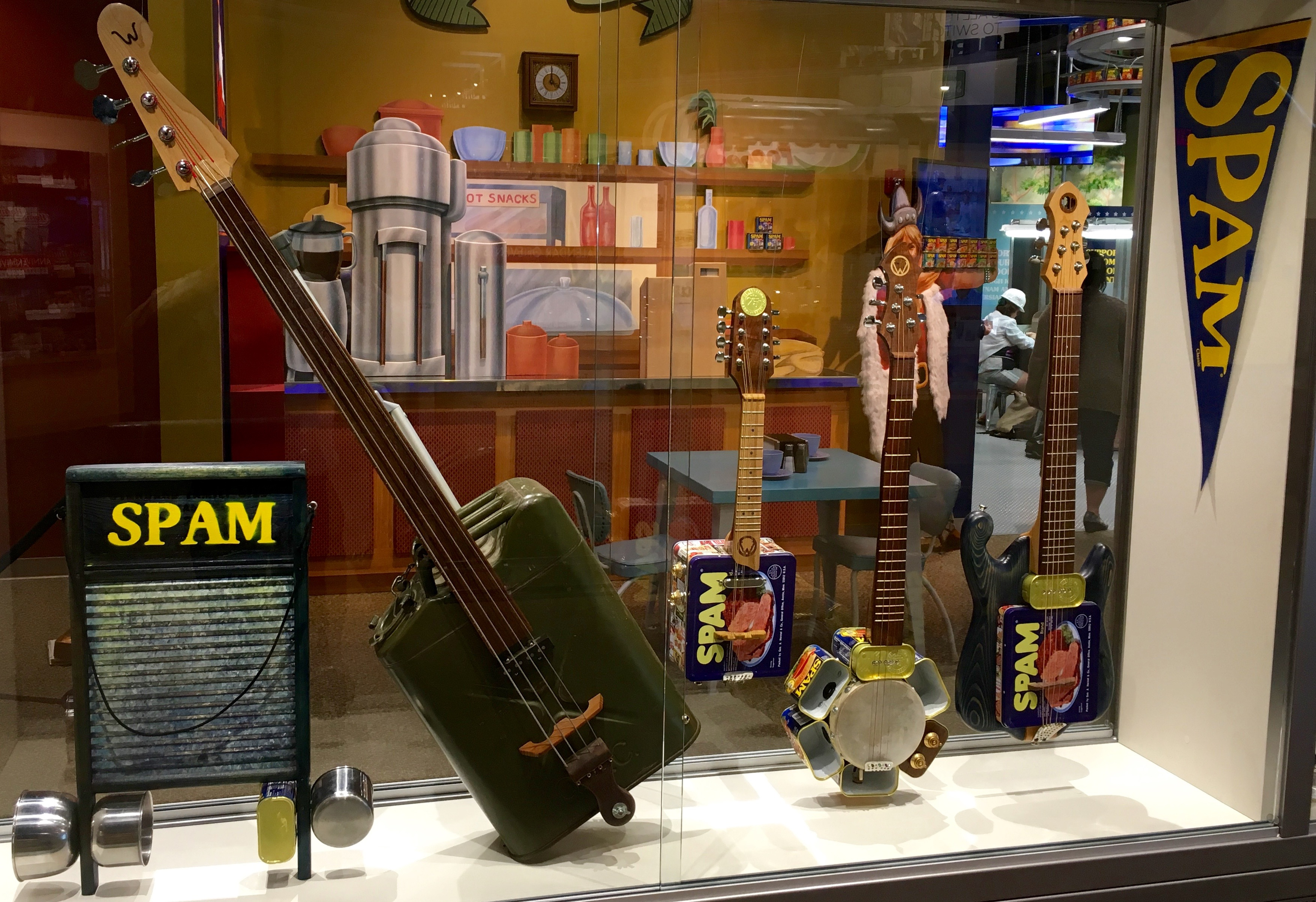
Canstruments at the Spam Museum

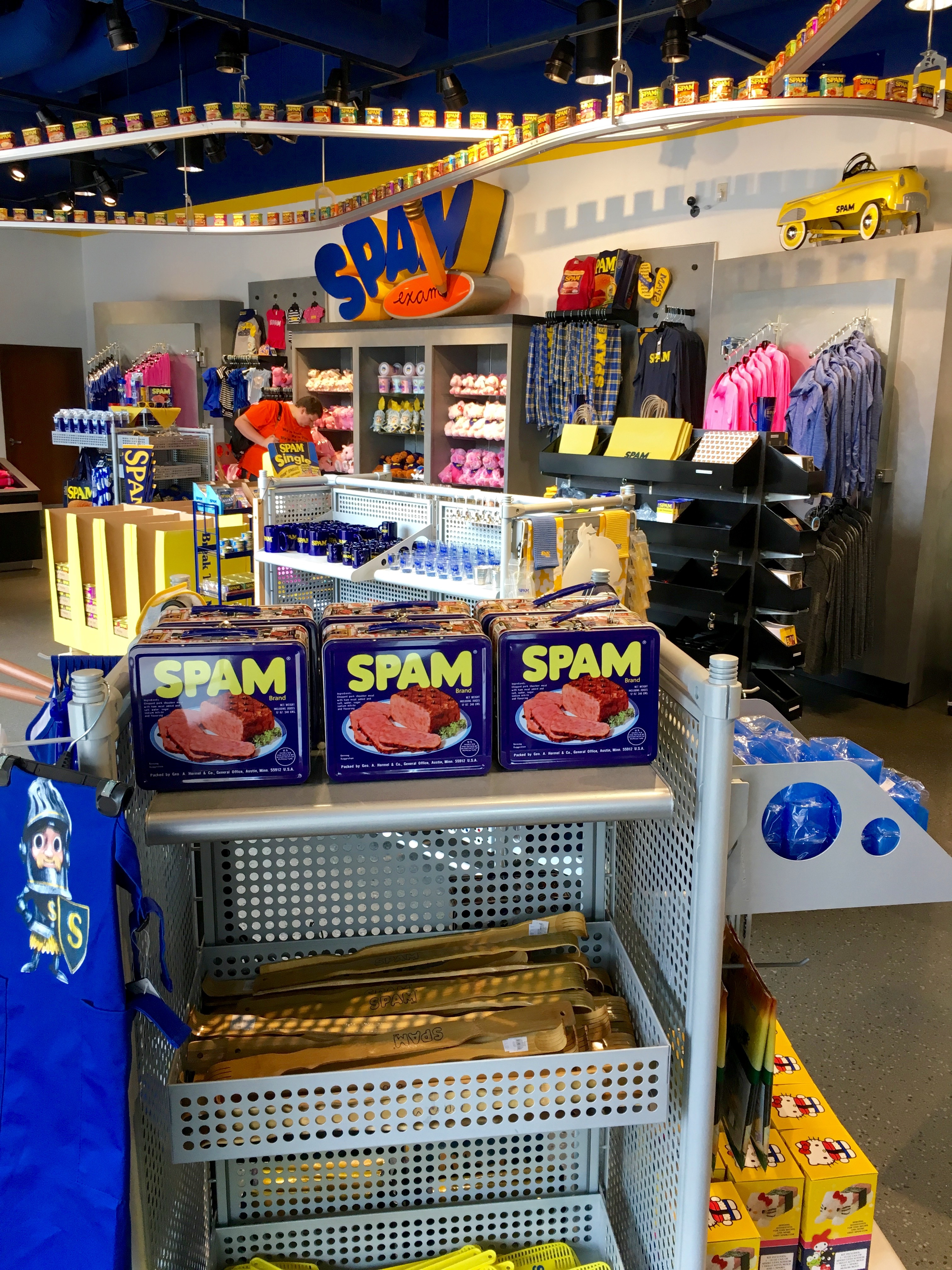
Gift Shop at the Spam Museum

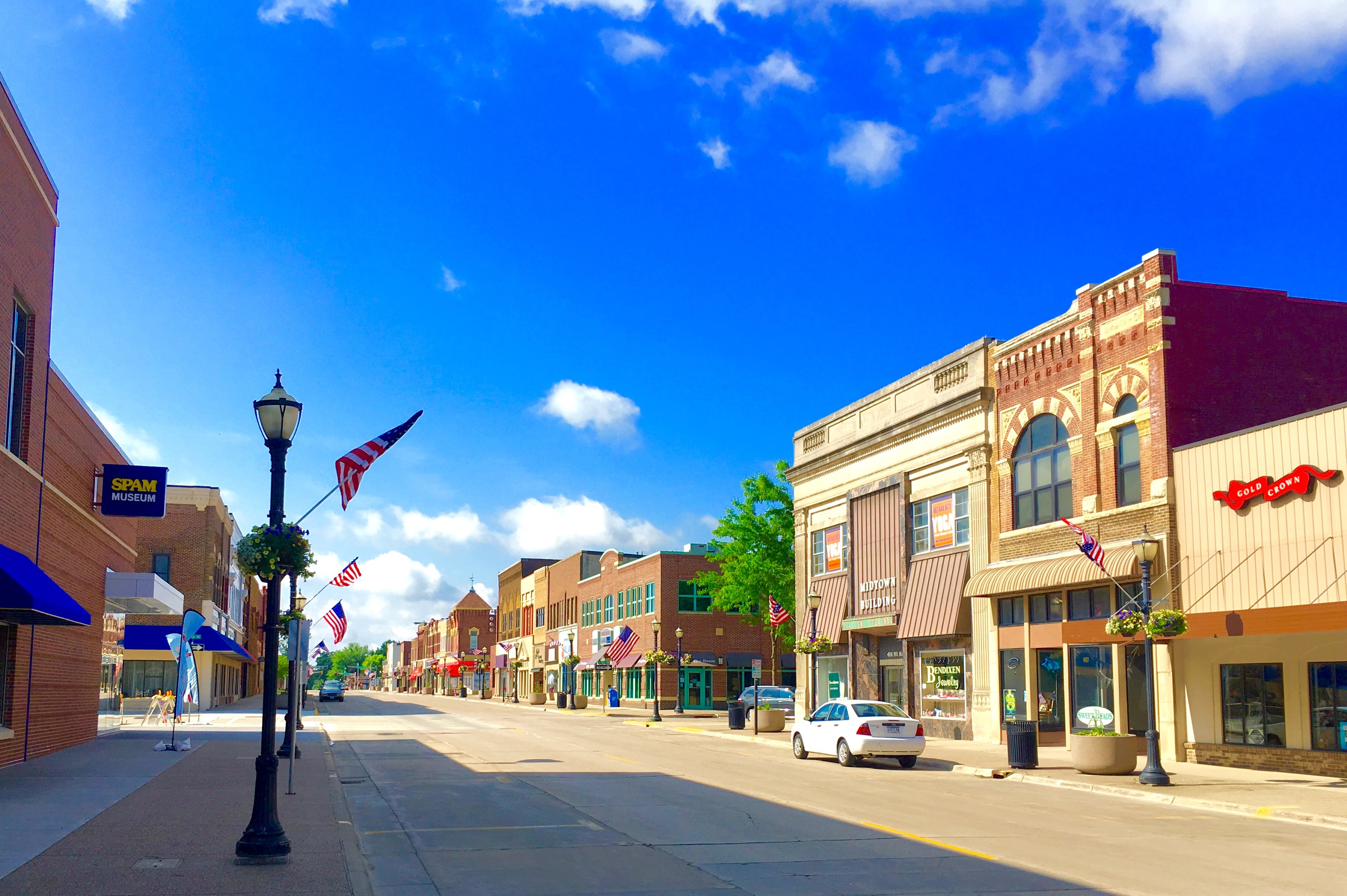
Spam Museum in Downtown Austin (2016–present)

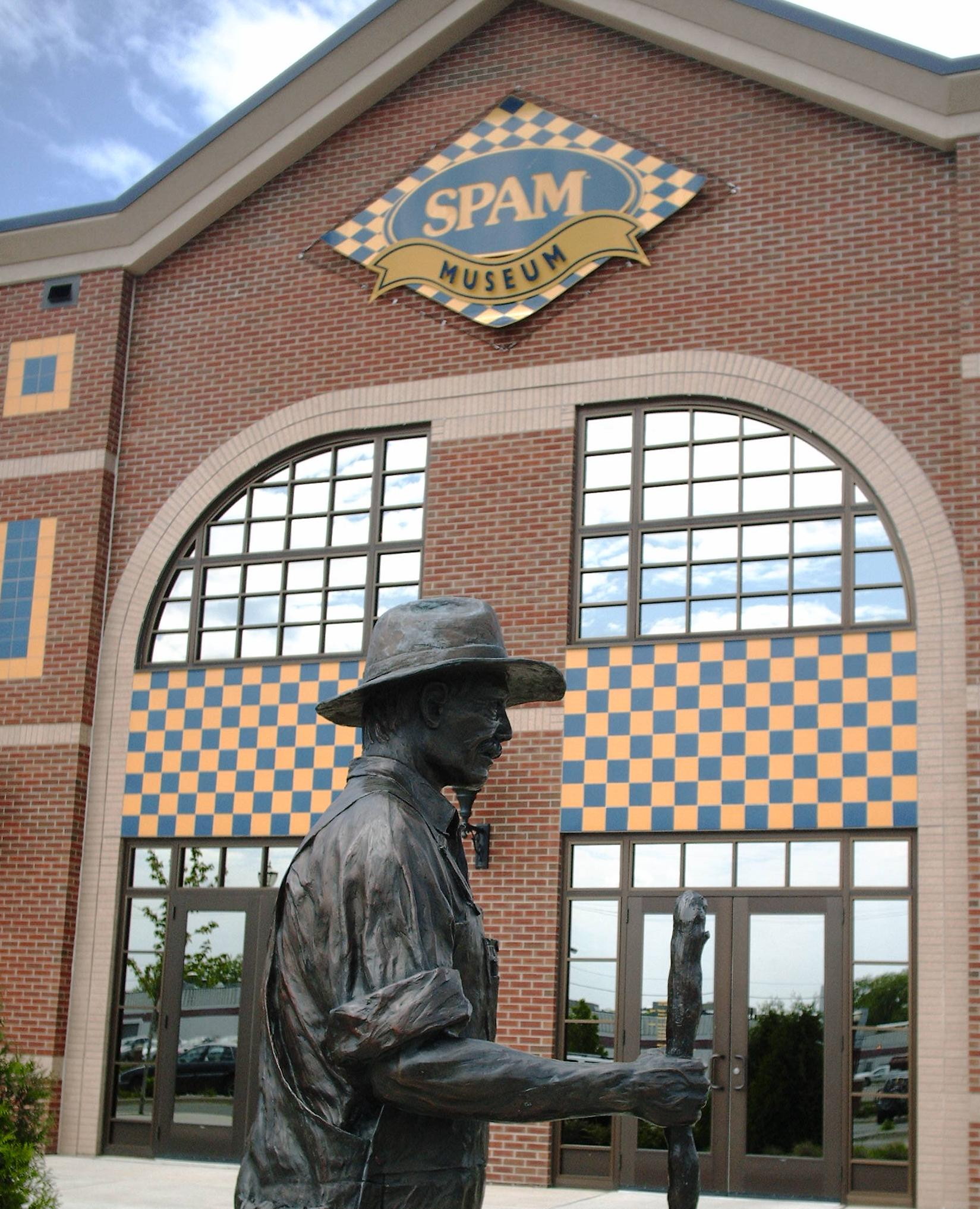
Former Spam Museum location (2001–2014)

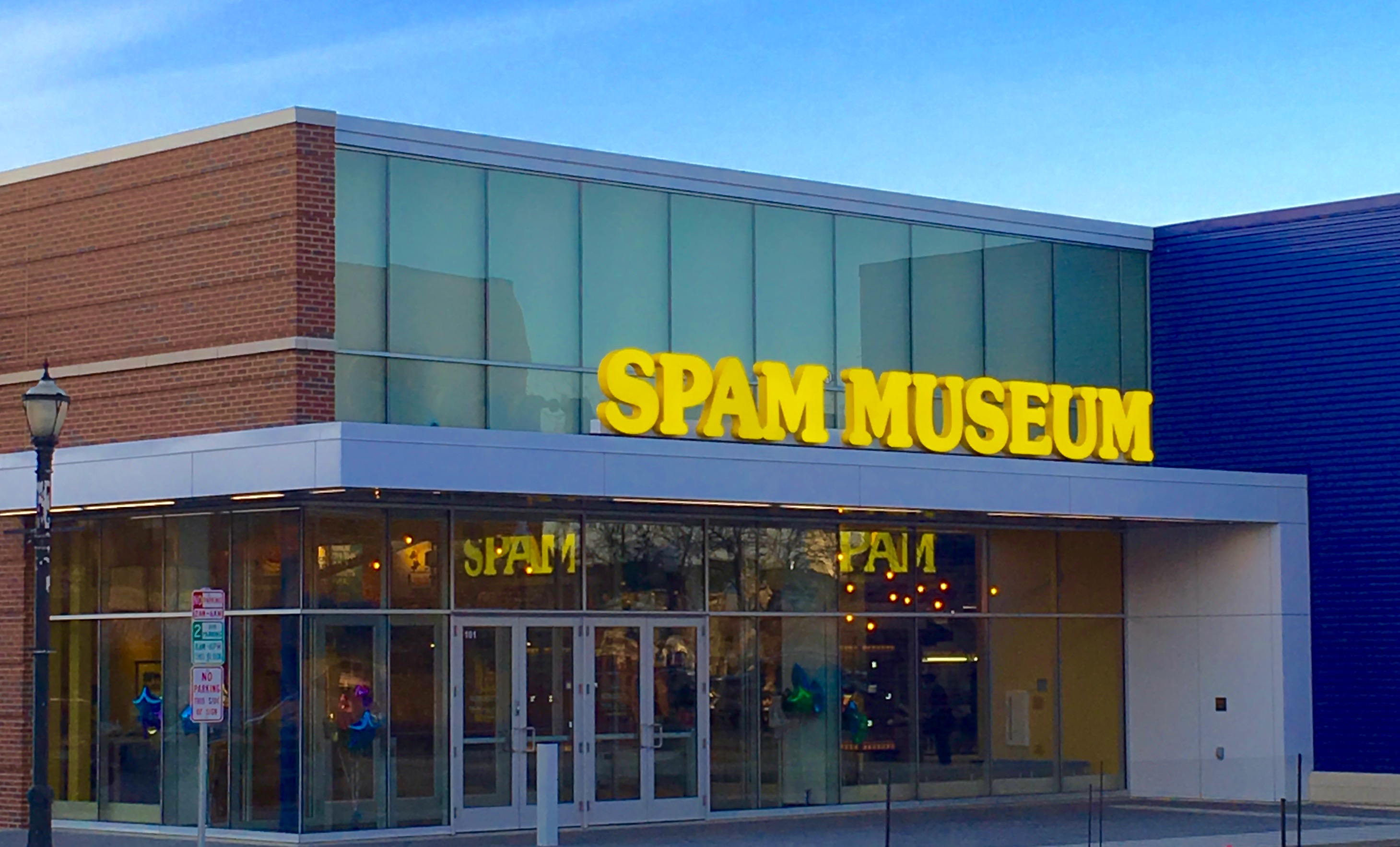
The Spam Museum at dusk

== See also ==
- Hormel Historic Home – Museum and historic home in Austin focusing on the Hormel family
