= Clay Constantinou =

American lawyer and diplomat

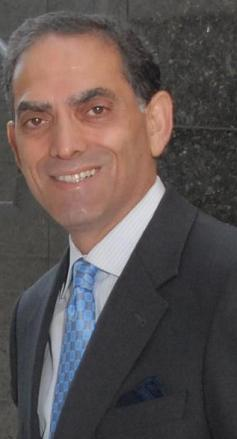

United States Ambassador to Luxembourg
- In office September 7, 1994 – January 30, 1999
- President: Bill Clinton
- Preceded by: Edward Morgan Rowell
- Succeeded by: James C. Hormel

Personal details
- Born: 1951 (age 74–75) New York, New York, U.S.
- Party: Democratic Party
- Education: New Jersey City University; Seton Hall University; New York University
- Occupation: Diplomat, Lawyer

Clay Constantinou (born 1951) is an American lawyer and diplomat. He served as US Ambassador to Luxembourg from 1994 to 1999 and as Dean of the Whitehead School of Diplomacy at Seton Hall University from 1999 to 2005. He is currently Of Counsel at Wilentz, Goldman & Spitzer, P.A. a law firm based in Woodbridge, NJ.

== Early life ==
Constantinou earned a B.A. in political science from New Jersey City University, a J.D. from Seton Hall University School of Law and an L.L.M. from the New York University School of Law. He practiced law and became a partner in the New Jersey law firm, Wilentz, Goldman & Spitzer.

Also active in politics, Constantinou first raised money as part of the Tsongas campaign in 1991 but was recruited and later led the Bill Clinton Presidential finance committee/campaign in New Jersey and served as president of the New Jersey State Electoral College, one of 15 electors casting their votes for the Clinton/Gore ticket. In 1989, Governor James Florio appointed him Commissioner of the New Jersey Turnpike Authority. Constantinou also served as a member of the Board of Directors of Essex County Utility Authority and of Horizon Blue Cross and Blue Shield of New Jersey.

== Ambassadorship ==
In 1994, Constantinou was appointed the United States Ambassador to Luxembourg. During his tenure, decisions were reached in Luxembourg including NATO expansion, European Union enlargement and Economic and Monetary Union. In the course of the 1997 Luxembourg European Union presidency, he led American delegations and participated in negotiations with EU officials on trade and global-cooperation issues. Ambassador Constantinou has also advised the Clinton Administration on Cyprus and Eastern Mediterranean issues.

== Deanship ==
In 1999, Constantinou was selected as the first permanent Dean of the Whitehead School of Diplomacy. In 2000 the School of Diplomacy was selected to serve as secretariat and project manager for the 2001 United Nations theme, Dialogue among Civilizations. The year-long effort produced a report, published by the School, entitled Crossing the Divide and was presented by United Nations Secretary-General Kofi Annan to the General Assembly. After two three-year terms as Dean, Constantinou returned to private practice.

== Honors ==
In 1991, he was named New Jersey City University Distinguished Alumnus and in 1997 Seton Hall University School of Law named him "Distinguished Graduate of the Year". In 1999, New Jersey City University conferred Constantinou a Doctor of Letters honoris causa.

In 1996, he earned a certificate at Harvard Kennedy School for his participation in the Senior Managers in Government program.

In 1999, Cyprus President Glafcos Clerides awarded Constantinou one of the Republic's highest distinctions, the Medal for Exceptional Services. In the same year Archbishop of Cyprus Chrysostomos bestowed upon him the Medal of Saint Barnabas the Apostle. Constantinou is also the recipient of other honors and awards including the Cyprus Federation of America, Annual Testimonial Award and the American Hellenic Institute, National Public Service Award.

Diplomatic posts
Preceded by Edward Morgan Rowell	United States Ambassador to Luxembourg; 7 September 1994–30 January 1999	Succeeded by James C. Hormel
Educational offices
Preceded by Terrence Blackburn acting Dean	Dean, Seton Hall School of Diplomacy; 1999–2005	Succeeded by Rev. Paul Holmes interim Dean
