= Martha Constantinou =

Cypriot-American physicist

Martha Constantinou is a physicist from Cyprus who works in the US as an associate professor of physics at Temple University. Her research focuses on theoretical and computational nuclear physics, using lattice QCD.

== Education and career ==
Constantinou was educated in physics at the University of Cyprus, where she received a bachelor's degree in 2003 and completed her Ph.D. in 2008. She continued there as a postdoctoral fellow from 2008 to 2011, and as a research associate from 2012 to 2015. Meanwhile, she took an assistant professorship at Temple University in 2012. In 2024, she was named as vice-chair of the university's physics department.

== Recognition ==
In 2023, Temple University named Constantinou as their Italia-Eire Foundation Distinguished Teacher of the Year.

Constantinou was named as a Fellow of the American Physical Society in 2025, after a nomination from the APS Topical Group on Hadronic Physics, "for outstanding contributions to the understanding of the structure of hadrons through first-principles calculations in lattice QCD, and for significant leadership in the nuclear physics community".
