= James C. Hormel =

American philanthropist (1933–2021)

Jim Hormel
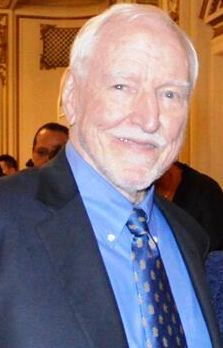
- Hormel in 2015

United States Ambassador to Luxembourg
- In office September 8, 1999 – January 1, 2001
- President: Bill Clinton
- Preceded by: Clay Constantinou
- Succeeded by: Gerald Loftus (acting)

Personal details
- Born: James Catherwood Hormel; January 1, 1933 Austin, Minnesota, U.S.
- Died: August 13, 2021 (aged 88) San Francisco, California, U.S.
- Party: Democratic
- Spouse(s): Alice Turner (divorced); Michael Nguyen Araque
- Children: 5
- Parent: Jay Catherwood Hormel (father)
- Relatives: Geordie Hormel (brother); George A. Hormel (grandfather)
- Education: Swarthmore College (BA); University of Chicago (JD)

James Catherwood Hormel (January 1, 1933 – August 13, 2021) was an American philanthropist, LGBT activist, diplomat, and heir to the Hormel meatpacking fortune. He served as the United States Ambassador to Luxembourg from 1999 to 2001, and was the first openly gay man to represent the United States as an ambassador.

== Early life and education ==
Hormel was born in Austin, Minnesota. He is the grandson of George A. Hormel, founder of Hormel Foods. Hormel is the son of Germaine Dubois and Jay Catherwood Hormel, who served as president of Hormel Foods. Hormel earned a Bachelor of Arts degree in history from Swarthmore College and a J.D. degree from the University of Chicago Law School. After law school, Hormel served as the dean of students and director of admissions at the University of Chicago Law School.

== Diplomatic career ==
In 1994, President Bill Clinton considered Hormel for the ambassadorship to Fiji, but did not put the nomination forward due to objections from Fijian government officials. At the time, gay male sexual acts were punishable with prison sentences in Fiji and Hormel's being open about his sexuality would stand in conflict with "Fijian culture". Instead, Hormel was named as part of the United Nations delegation from the United States to the Human Rights Commission in 1995, and in 1996 became an alternate for the United Nations General Assembly.

In October 1997, Clinton nominated Hormel to be ambassador to Luxembourg, which had removed laws prohibiting consensual same-sex acts between adults in the 1800s. This appointment was the first nomination or appointment of an openly LGBT person from the United States. The Senate Foreign Relations Committee approved his nomination with only Republican and conservative Senators Jesse Helms and John Ashcroft opposed. While his confirmation by the senate initially seemed certain, with only two senators—Tim Hutchinson and James Inhofe—opposing the nomination, subsequent revelations about Hormel's background led to more opposition from Republican senators, leaving Hormel's nomination in limbo. Among the points of contention were:

- The James C. Hormel Gay and Lesbian Center at the San Francisco Public Library, which Hormel funded, was found to contain pornographic materials and documents published by the pro-pedophilia advocacy group NAMBLA. Christian-based conservative groups like the Traditional Values Coalition (TVC) and the Family Research Council (FRC) labelled Hormel as being pro-pornography, asserting that Hormel would be rejected in the largely Roman Catholic Luxembourg. The Washington Post later wrote that much of the same material could also be found in the Library of Congress, and Hormel said that he had nothing to do with the selection.
- The FRC distributed video tapes of a television interview with Hormel at the 1996 San Francisco Pride parade in which Hormel laughed at a joke about the Sisters of Perpetual Indulgence, a group of men who dress in drag as nuns to mock religious conventions, as they passed by. The Catholic League took this as an indication of approval of what they characterized as an anti-Catholic group. In a meeting with Tim Hutchinson, Hormel declined to repudiate the Sisters. In an interview years later, Hormel objected to the idea that the video clip showed that he approved of the group and that he was anti-Catholic.
- It was revealed that Hormel had contributed $12,000 to fund the production of It's Elementary: Talking About Gay Issues in School, a video aimed at teaching tolerance of homosexuality to grade-school students. This especially inflamed Senator Bob Smith of New Hampshire, who was portrayed unflatteringly in the film. Smith contended that he opposed Hormel not because he was gay but because of his "advocacy of the gay lifestyle".

Trent Lott, the Republican majority leader, worked to block the vote and publicly called homosexuality a sin and compared it to alcoholism and kleptomania.

Concerns about Hormel's reception in Luxembourg were "blunted when officials of the country, which has laws against discrimination based on sexual orientation, indicated that he would be welcome." Senator Al D'Amato of New York found the obstruction of the nomination an embarrassment and urged that Trent Lott bring the issue up for a vote. When Lott continued to stall, Clinton employed a recess appointment on June 4, 1999. Hormel was sworn in as ambassador in June 1999. His partner at the time, Timothy Wu, held the Bible during the ceremony. Also in attendance were Hormel's former wife, his five children, and several of his grandchildren. The treatment of his nomination was referenced by Pete Buttigieg during his acceptance speech for his nomination as Secretary of Transportation on December 16, 2020.

== Philanthropy and advocacy ==
In 1981, he was one of the founders of the Human Rights Campaign. He was a member of the boards of directors of the San Francisco Chamber of Commerce and the American Foundation for AIDS Research. Hormel contributed $500,000 to fund the creation of the James C. Hormel Gay & Lesbian Center at the San Francisco Public Library in 1996 (renamed the James C. Hormel LGBTQIA Center in 2016).

Hormel participated in numerous events, including a conference organized in 2004 by Amnesty International in the frame of the Geneva Gay Pride. In 2010 he was given the Lifetime Achievement Grand Marshal Award by San Francisco Pride Board of Directors for his LGBT activism over several decades.

== Personal life and death ==
Hormel's brother, Geordie Hormel, was a musician and recording studio proprietor. James Hormel was married to Alice Turner, now a retired psychologist, for ten years before coming out of the closet. They were married from 1956 to 1965. Hormel had five children, fourteen grandchildren, and five great-grandchildren. He lived in San Francisco, California, with his spouse Michael Peter Nguyen Araque.

James Hormel died in San Francisco on August 13, 2021, at the age of 88.

== See also ==
- List of LGBT ambassadors of the United States

Diplomatic posts
Preceded by Clay Constantinou	United States Ambassador to Luxembourg; 1999–2001	Succeeded by Gerald Loftus; Acting
