= Fivos Constantinou =

Cypriot distance runner

- Fivos Constantinou at the 2005 All New England Meet

Personal information
- Native name: Φοίβος Κωνσταντίνου
- Nationality: Cypriot
- Born: May 27, 1981 (age 45) Cyprus
- Education: MIT (Computer Science)

Sport
- Sport: Running (Distance, Cross Country, Track and Field)
- University team: MIT Cross Country and Indoor and Outdoor Track and Field Teams
- Club: G.S.Z. (Cyprus)

Fivos Constantinou (Greek: Φοίβος Κωνσταντίνου; born 27 May 1981) is a Cyprus Native and holds undergraduate and graduate degrees in computer science from MIT. Fivos is well known for his accomplishments as a distance runner on the track as well as in Cross Country. He has competed for the MIT Cross Country and Indoor and Outdoor Track and Field Teams. In his senior year he was the Cross Country team captain and was voted as the team's MVP by the team members.

Prior to his collegiate career Fivos competed for his local track club in Cyprus, G.S.Z., and was a 4 time National champion. He won National titles in 800m and 1500m races as well as 2 Cross Country titles.

== Personal Bests ==
"(xc)" indicates Cross Country
"(i)" indicates Indoor Track

Distance	Mark	Date	Location
800 m (i)	1:57.74	2005-02-05	Boston University
800 m	1:57.70	2005-04-09	MIT
1,000 m (i)	2:34.6	2005-01-29	Bowdoin College
1,000 m	2:33.0	2000-03-25	GSZ, Cyprus
1,500 m (i)	4:00.9	2005-01-15	MIT
1,500 m	3:59.81	2006-05-06	Springfield College
Mile (i)	4:16.19	2005-02-05	Boston University
3,000 m (i)	8:38.20	2007-01-28	Boston University
3,000 m (xc)	9:47	1997-01-05	Athalassa, Cyprus
4,000 m (xc)	12:58	1998-12-11	Kiti, Cyprus
5,000 m	15:07.52	2007-04-21	MIT
8,000 m (xc)	25:35	2005-09-17	UMass Dartmouth
10,000 m	32:47	2012-04	
10,000 m (xc)	32:54	2006-01-07	Aradippou, Cyprus
Half Marathon	1:10:39	2008-10-05	San Jose
