= George A. Hormel =

American businessman

- Born: George Albert Hormel; December 4, 1860; Buffalo, New York, U.S.
- Died: June 5, 1946 (aged 85); Los Angeles, California, U.S.
- Known for: Founder of Hormel Foods Corporation
- Spouse: Lillian Belle Gleason
- Children: Jay Catherwood Hormel
- Relatives: James Hormel (grandson); Geordie Hormel (grandson); Smokey Hormel (great-grandson)

George Albert Hormel (December 4, 1860 – June 5, 1946) was an American entrepreneur. In 1891, he founded Hormel Foods Corporation (then known as George A. Hormel & Co.). Hormel's ownership stake in the company made him one of the wealthiest Americans during his lifetime.

== Early life ==
Hormel was born in Buffalo, New York, in 1860 to German immigrant John George Hormel, a leather tanner, and Susannah "Susan" Hormel (née Decker), and later settled in Austin, Minnesota. At the age of twelve, he began working in a Chicago packinghouse. Hormel married Lilian Belle Gleason in 1892.

== Hormel Foods Corporation ==
He established his meat packing company in 1891 and established a food company that continues to thrive today.

He remained head of the company until 1929, when he passed it to his son Jay Catherwood Hormel.

== Death and legacy ==
He died on June 5, 1946, in Los Angeles, California, at the age of 85. He is buried at Oakwood Cemetery in Austin, Minnesota.

His great-grandson Smokey Hormel is a noted guitarist.

== See also ==
- Hormel Historic Home
