= School of Diplomacy and International Relations =

International relations school of Seton Hall University

Coordinates: 40.74337°N 74.24648°W

- Motto: Preparing the Next Generation of Global Leaders
- Type: Private constituent college
- Established: 1997
- Parent institution: Seton Hall University
- Affiliations: APSIA
- Dean: Courtney Smith
- Undergraduates: 375
- Postgraduates: 110
- Location: South Orange, New Jersey, United States
- Website: shu.edu/diplomacy

The School of Diplomacy and International Relations is the international affairs school of Seton Hall University, a private Catholic research university in South Orange, New Jersey, United States. Founded in collaboration with the United Nations Association of the United States of America, it was the first school of international relations to be founded after the Cold War. The school offers both undergraduate and graduate programs in a number of fields connecting international relations with economics, homeland security, and law.

== History ==
The school was founded in 1997, and welcomed its first class in the Fall of 1998. Among the founding members was its first dean, Ambassador Clay Constantinou, a former U.S. diplomat and graduate of Seton Hall Law. The school was later named in honor of retired Goldman Sachs executive and philanthropist John C. Whitehead, who served as deputy secretary of state under President Ronald Reagan from 1985–89; Whitehead also headed the United Nations Association of the United States of America and was the Chairman of the Lower Manhattan Development Corporation. As the first school of international relations in the post–Cold War era, the Whitehead School was founded with a need to "prepare the next generation of global leaders."

The school's founding was supported by the United Nations Association of the United States of America, with which it still enjoys a close relationship. Its close proximity to New York City has also historically allowed its students and faculty to participate in U.N.-sponsored functions. Consequently, students from the school often interact with U.N. diplomats. The alliance with UNA-USA has also afforded students opportunities to receive internships and employment with various organizations of the U.N.

Both policymakers and international relations scholars have recognized Diplomacy as a top-ranked global program. Diplomacy is affiliated with the UN Department of Global Communications and Seton Hall is recognized as an NGO with Consultative Status at the UN Economic and Social Council.

== Academics ==
The school offers both undergraduate and graduate degrees.

At the undergraduate level, it offers a Bachelor of Science in Diplomacy and International Relations, as well as a B.S. in International Economics and International Relations, International Quantitative Economics and International Relations, Law and Diplomacy, and International and Homeland Security.

The school offers two accelerated undergraduate degrees:

- a B.S./M.A. 3+2 degree coupling undergraduate and graduate study within Diplomacy, and
- a B.S/J.D. with the Seton Hall University Law School

At the graduate level it offers four programs. In addition to the Master of Arts in Diplomacy and International Relations, the school delivers an online executive M.S. in International Affairs and Diplomacy in partnership with the United Nations Institute for Training and Research, deepening the School’s relationship with the U.N. system; and an executive M.S. in International Affairs available in on-campus, online, and hybrid formats. It also offers both an online M.S. in Homeland Security and Cyber Resilience, and an M.S. in Conflict and Security Analysis.

Certain of the school’s programs are provided in a dual-degree format in collaboration with other academic units of the university. These include:

- M.A./J.D. with the Seton Hall University Law School
- M.A./M.B.A. with the Stillman School of Business
- M.A./M.P.A. with the College of Arts and Sciences
- M.A./M.A. in Strategic Communication with the College of Human Development, Culture, and Media.

In addition to full-degree programs the school offers graduate certificates and a United Nations Intensive Summer Study Program. The UN program may be taken as a three credit course for credit or not for credit.

=== Experiential learning programs ===
Undergraduate students are required to complete at least one for-credit internship and graduate students are required to complete at least one for-credit internship prior to graduating, and Diplomacy helps students apply for these. Both undergraduate and graduate students have the opportunity to spend a semester in Washington, D.C. as part of the school's collaboration with the United Nations Foundation.

== World Leaders Forum ==
The school hosts lectures as part of its World Leaders Forum. Two previous United Nations Secretaries-General, Kofi Annan and Ban Ki-moon, have participated in the forum, as well as Sinn Féin Leader Gerry Adams, Iranian President Mohammed Khatami, Nobel Peace Laureate John Hume, President of Israel Shimon Peres, and former Soviet President Mikhail Gorbachev. Diplomacy has hosted Nobel Peace Laureate Leymah Gbowee, Nobel Peace Laureate Nadia Murad, United States National Security Advisor Susan Rice, United States Ambassador to the United Nations Samantha Power, and United States Ambassador to the United Nations Linda Thomas-Greenfield. Multiple Presidents of the United Nations General Assembly have spoken at the school, including Miroslav Lajčák, Csaba Kőrösi, Dennis Francis and Philémon Yang. Other heads of state have included former Polish President Lech Wałęsa, and former British Prime Minister Tony Blair. Multiple Vatican officials have addressed the forum as well.

== Journal of Diplomacy and International Relations ==
The Journal of Diplomacy and International Relations is an internationally-distributed periodical produced by the school's graduate students. It is indexed by Columbia International Affairs Online, the International Relations and Security Network, Public Affairs Information Service, International Political Science Abstracts, and America: History and Life and Historical Abstracts.
