= National Register of Historic Places listings in Kandiyohi County, Minnesota =

Location of Kandiyohi County in Minnesota

This is a list of the National Register of Historic Places listings in Kandiyohi County, Minnesota. It is intended to be a complete list of the properties and districts on the National Register of Historic Places in Kandiyohi County, Minnesota, United States. The locations of National Register properties and districts for which the latitude and longitude coordinates are included below, may be seen in an online map.

There are 15 properties and districts listed on the National Register in the county. Two properties were once listed but have been removed.

This National Park Service list is complete through NPS recent listings posted November 13, 2026.

== Current listings ==
	Name on the Register	Image	Date listed	Location	City or town	Description
1	John Bosch Farmstead	John Bosch Farmstead	April 23, 1987 (#87000620)	County Road 4; 45°02′45″N 94°50′17″W	Lake Lillian vicinity	Farmstead of John Bosch (1898–1978), a founder and leader of the Farmers' Holiday Association, the nation's most radical and successful agricultural protest movement of the Great Depression. Comprises seven contributing properties built 1885–1936.
2	Andreas, Johanna, Anna and Frank E. Broman Farmstead	Andreas, Johanna, Anna and Frank E. Broman Farmstead	February 28, 1991 (#91000098)	Off County Road 8 between Swan Lake and Kasota Lake; 45°04′35″N 94°54′34″W	Kandiyohi vicinity	Unusually intact example of west-central Minnesota's late-19th-century farmsteads, with structures dating to 1885; occupied by three generations of a family representative of the region's Swedish American populace.
3	District No. 55 School	District No. 55 School	April 16, 1987 (#87000619)	US Highway 71; 45°00′32″N 95°02′41″W	Willmar vicinity	1907 school significant as one of the key meeting sites where the Farmers' Holiday Association was organized in the early 1930s. Also known as the Svea School.
4	Lars and Guri Endreson House	Lars and Guri Endreson House	July 24, 1986 (#86001920)	Off County Highway 5; 45°11′02″N 95°06′22″W	Willmar vicinity	Circa-1858 log cabin, one of Kandiyohi County's oldest buildings on its original site and a rare vestige of its Euro-American settlement prior to the Dakota War of 1862, in which numerous pioneers were killed (including two Endresons) and most of the rest abandoned the area for several years. Now a museum.
5	Hotel Atwater	Hotel Atwater	June 13, 1986 (#86001330)	322 Atlantic Ave. 45°08′14″N 94°46′55″W	Atwater	Prominent and rare surviving example of west-central Minnesota's railroad-era downtown hotels, built in 1904 to attract commerce.
6	Kasota Lake Site	Kasota Lake Site	August 28, 2012 (#12000559)	County Rd. 134; east shore of Kasota Lake; 45°04′38″N 94°52′51″W	Kandiyohi vicinity	Pre-contact domestic site with well-stratified ceramic artifacts, indicating 2,700 years of use across the Woodland, Plains Village, and Oneota periods.
7	Lakeland Hotel	Lakeland Hotel	February 14, 2012 (#12000006)	407 Litchfield Ave. SW, 302 4th St. SW; 45°07′17″N 95°02′54″W	Willmar	1927 hotel that provided Willmar's finest accommodations to traveling salesmen and tourists and a popular social venue to locals.
8	A. Larson & Co. Building	A. Larson & Co. Building	March 2, 1989 (#89000156)	539 W. Pacific Ave. 45°07′19″N 95°03′03″W	Willmar	1876 commercial building expanded circa 1885, noted for its well-preserved Italianate architecture and association with the early development of Willmar as a railroad town.
9	Sibley State Park CCC/Rustic Style Historic District	Sibley State Park CCC/Rustic Style Historic District	January 22, 1992 (#89001673)	Off U.S. Route 71 west of New London; 45°18′49″N 95°02′13″W	New London vicinity	19 park facilities built 1935–38, significant as highly intact examples of New Deal federal work relief, early state park development, National Park Service rustic design, and successful master planning.
10	Albert H. and Jennie C. Sperry House	Albert H. and Jennie C. Sperry House	January 10, 2020 (#100004861)	228 Porto Rico St. 45°07′36″N 95°02′14″W	Willmar	Willmar's finest remaining single-family brick house from the Victorian era, built in 1893. Preserved on the grounds of the Kandiyohi County Historical Society.
11	John M. Spicer Summer House and Farm	John M. Spicer Summer House and Farm	August 6, 1986 (#86002292)	600 S. Lake Ave. 45°14′05″N 94°53′41″W	Spicer vicinity	Well-preserved early-20th-century summer home complex in a popular resort area. Also associated with influential land developer John M. Spicer (1841–1928). Now the Spicer Castle Inn & Restaurant. Torn down in 2020.
12	Willmar Auditorium	Willmar Auditorium	August 9, 1991 (#91000976)	311 6th St., SW. 45°07′14″N 95°03′01″W	Willmar	Municipal auditorium built 1935–38 as a major work relief project. Also noted for its fine Moderne architecture and interior artwork.
13	Willmar Hospital Farm for Inebriates Historic District	Willmar Hospital Farm for Inebriates Historic District	August 13, 1986 (#86001535)	1700 Technology Dr. NE. 45°08′32″N 95°01′06″W	Willmar	Minnesota's most intact early state hospital complex, with 22 contributing properties built 1912–1933, exemplifying the era's novel cottage-based design and the work of Clarence H. Johnston Sr. Now the MinnWest Technology Campus.
14	Willmar Municipal Airport	Willmar Municipal Airport	January 14, 2013 (#12001174)	2321 Airport Dr. 45°06′52″N 95°04′31″W	Willmar	Airport established in 1934 as a federal work relief project, with a 1941 hangar built by the National Youth Administration. Also associated with prominent longtime manager John L. Rice (serving 1945–1983).
15	Willmar Tribune Building	Willmar Tribune Building	May 15, 2007 (#07000425)	311 4th St., SW. 45°07′16″N 95°02′51″W	Willmar	Newspaper office active 1920–1980, associated with the regionally influential Willmar Daily Tribune and its longtime owner-turned-politician Victor E. Lawson (1871–1960), a prominent advocate for populist reforms.

== Former listings ==
	Name on the Register	Image	Date listed	Date removed	Location	City or town	Description
1	Mount Tom Lookout Shelter	Mount Tom Lookout Shelter	January 22, 1992 (#91002030)	June 22, 1993	Sibley State Park; 45°19′34″N 95°01′57″W	Lake Andrew Township	1938 stone National Park Service rustic shelter. Reconstruction in 1992 significantly altered the appearance by adding a second story.
2	John M. Spicer House	John M. Spicer House	August 13, 1986 (#86001545)	November 27, 2017	515 7th St., NW. 45°07′33″N 95°03′17″W	Willmar	House built circa 1873 for businessman John M. Spicer (1841–1928), the most influential figure in Kandiyohi County's settlement through his rail and townsite developments. Demolished in 2014.

== See also ==
- List of National Historic Landmarks in Minnesota
- National Register of Historic Places listings in Minnesota
