= Monongalia County, Minnesota =

Coordinates: 45°18′0″N 94°57′0″W

- Former county
- Survey map of Monongalia County (top) and Kandiyohi County, Minnesota (bottom) c. 1860
- County: United States
- State: Minnesota
- County seat: New London, Minnesota
- Founded: March 1858
- Organized: 1861
- Disestablished: January 1871
- Merged into: Kandiyohi County, Minnesota

Monongalia County is a former county in the U.S. state of Minnesota. The county was established in March of 1858 by the Minnesota Territorial Legislature, although the Dakota War of 1862 delayed its organization until 1861. The county was merged with Kandiyohi County, Minnesota in January 1871.

== History ==
=== Namesake ===
The county was named after Monongalia County, Virginia (now Monongalia County, West Virginia).^{:268}^{:37} Monongalia is a latinized version of the Delaware word "Monongahela" (river with sliding banks) which was the Delaware term for the Monongahela River.^{:268}

According to the book The Illustrated History of Kandiyohi County, Minnesota, the name Monongalia was chosen primarily due to the fact that many of the settlers of both Irving Township and Harrison Township in the county came from Monongalia County, Virginia.^{:37} One such promoter of the county's name was Eugene M. Wilson, who was born in Morgantown, the county seat of Monongalia County, Virginia.^{:37} Wilson is considered the "Father of Monongalia County".^{:37}

=== Organization ===
The temporary county seat of Monongalia County was first established at Columbia (now Spicer, Minnesota) in 1856 near the southern section of Green Lake.^{:38} In 1865 a permanent county seat was later established at New London, Minnesota.^{:38} Beginning in 1861, the county was represented in the Minnesota Senate by Minnesota's 6th Senate district, and in the Minnesota House of Representatives by Minnesota's 6th House district.

=== 1871 merge ===
In 1870 the Minnesota Legislature ordered the county to be merged with Kandiyohi County, its southern neighbor.^{:268} Up until 1870 neither county had been able to raise enough money to build a courthouse. In February 1871, they finally agreed to make Willmar the new county seat, succeeding to Kandiyohi Station.
