= Andrew Lake =

Andrew Lake or Lake Andrew may refer to:

- Andrew Lake (Alaska), a lake on Adak Island
- Lake Andrew (Douglas County, Minnesota), a lake in Douglas County
- Andrew Lake (Kandiyohi County, Minnesota), a lake
- Lake Andrew Township, Kandiyohi County, Minnesota
