= Kandiyohi =

Kandiyohi can refer to a location in the United States:

- Kandiyohi, Minnesota, a small city
- Kandiyohi County, Minnesota
- Kandiyohi Township, Kandiyohi County, Minnesota
