= Roseland =

Roseland may refer to:

- Roseland (film), a 1977 Merchant Ivory film
- Roseland (band), a musical collaboration (duo) between Tyler Bates and Azam Ali
- Roseland NYC Live, a live album and DVD by Portishead

== Buildings and organisations ==
- Roseland (Ferriday, Louisiana), listed on the NRHP in Louisiana
- Roseland (Kingsport, Tennessee), listed on the NRHP in Tennessee
- Roseland Ballroom in New York City
- Roseland Christian School in Chicago, Illinois, United States
- Roseland Cottage in Woodstock, Connecticut, United States
- Roseland Observatory, an astronomical observatory in Cornwall, England
- Roseland Park, a defunct amusement park in New York State
- Roseland Plantation (Faunsdale, Alabama), listed on the NRHP in Alabama
- Roseland Theater, a concert venue in Portland, Oregon, United States
- Roseland Waterpark in Canandaigua, New York

== Places ==
=== Canada ===
- Roseland, Windsor, Ontario, Canada
- Roseland, Manitoba, Canada

=== United Kingdom ===
- Roseland Peninsula, Cornwall, United Kingdom

=== United States ===
- Roseland, California
- Roseland, Florida
- Roseland, Chicago, Illinois
- Roseland, Indiana
- Roseland, Kansas
- Roseland, Louisiana
- Roseland, Minnesota
- Roseland, Missouri
- Roseland, Nebraska
- Roseland, New Jersey
- Roseland, Ohio
- Roseland Township, Kandiyohi County, Minnesota
- Roseland Township, Adams County, Nebraska

== See also ==
- Rose Land Park Plat Historic District, East Providence Rhode Island, United States
- Roselands, New South Wales, Australia
