= Lake Elizabeth =

Lake Elizabeth or Elizabeth Lake may refer to

- Elizabeth Lake (Los Angeles County, California), a large lake near Palmdale, California (U.S.)
  - Elizabeth Lake, California, an unincorporated community
- Lake Elizabeth (Fremont, California), a lake in Northern California
- Lake Elizabeth (Kandiyohi County, Minnesota)
- Lake Elizabeth Township, Minnesota, a town in Minnesota (U.S.)
- Lake Elizabeth (Florida)
- Lake Elizabeth (Victoria), Australia
- Elizabeth Lake (Glacier County, Montana), a lake in Glacier National Park
- Elizabeth Lake (Yosemite National Park), a lake in Yosemite National Park
- Elizabeth Lake (Wisconsin and Illinois), a lake in Kenosha County, Wisconsin and McHenry County, Illinois

== People ==
- Elizabeth Lake, the pen name of British novelist Inez Pearn
