= Lake Eight =

Lake in the state of Minnesota, United States

- Location within Minnesota Location within the United States
- Location: Kandiyohi County, Minnesota
- Coordinates: 45°18′17″N 94°58′55″W
- Type: lake
- Basin countries: United States
- Surface elevation: 1,188 ft (362 m)

Lake Eight is a lake in Kandiyohi County, in the U.S. state of Minnesota.

Lake Eight was named from the fact it is in section 8 on county maps.

== See also ==
- List of lakes in Minnesota
