= Endreson =

Endreson is a surname. Notable people with the surname include:

- Bjørn Endreson (1922–1998), Norwegian actor, stage producer, and theatre director
- Håkon Endreson (1891–1970), Norwegian gymnast

== See also ==
- Endreson Cabin
- Endresen
