= Green Lake Township =

Green Lake Township may refer to the following places in the United States:

- Green Lake Township, Michigan
- Green Lake Township, Kandiyohi County, Minnesota
