= Hystad Lake =

Lake in the state of Minnesota, United States

- Location within Minnesota Location within the United States
- Location: Kandiyohi County, Minnesota
- Coordinates: 45°23′7″N 95°7′13″W
- Type: lake
- Basin countries: United States
- Surface elevation: 1,270 ft (387 m)

Hystad Lake is a lake in Kandiyohi County, in the U.S. state of Minnesota. It was named after Andrew O. Hystad, a settler of the region.

== See also ==
- List of lakes in Minnesota
