= Svea, Minnesota =

Unincorporated community in Minnesota, United States

Svea
- Unincorporated community
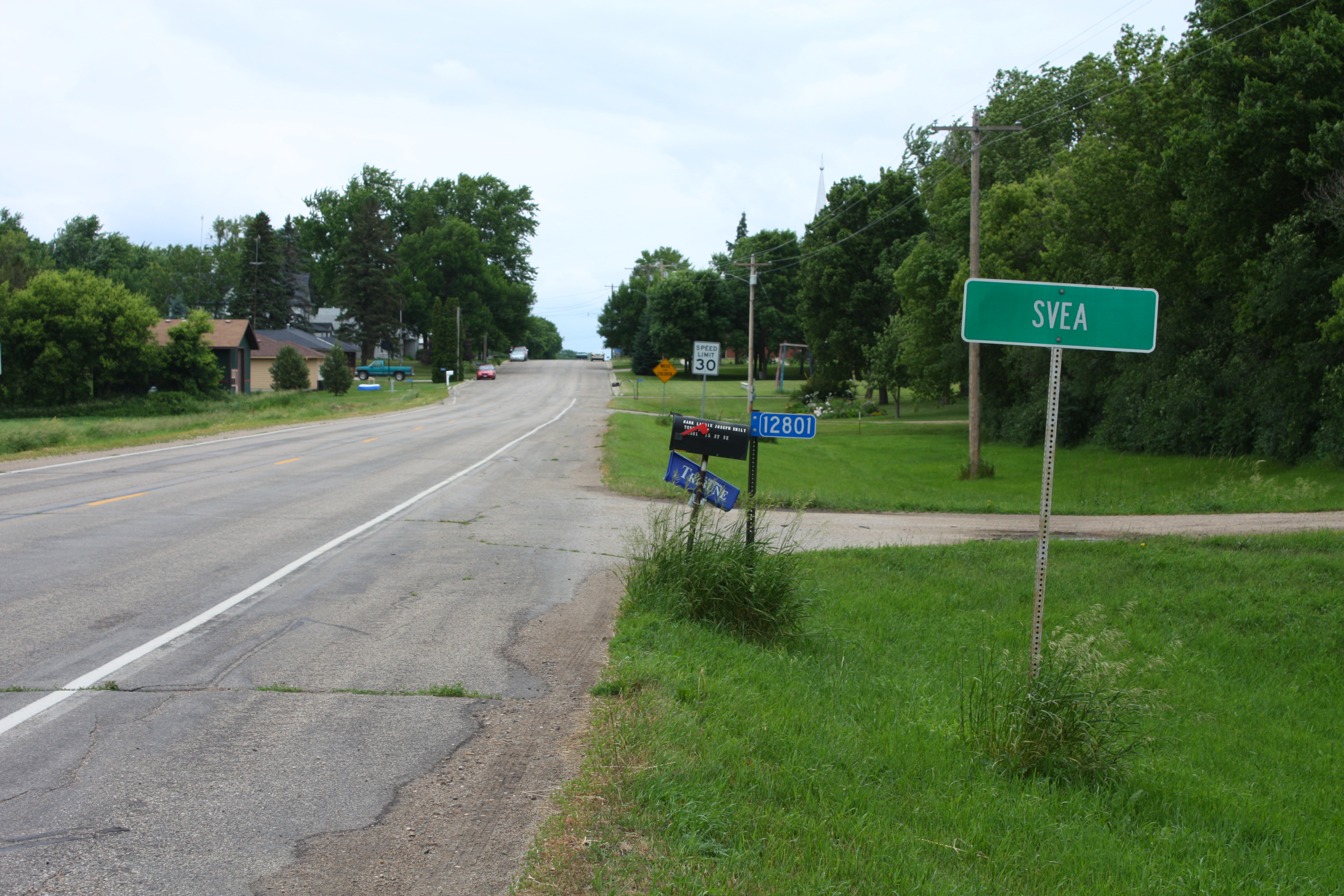
- Entering Svea

- Location within Minnesota Location within the United States
- Coordinates: 45°00′12″N 95°01′17″W
- Country: United States
- State: Minnesota
- County: Kandiyohi
- Township: Whitefield
- Elevation: 1,152 ft (351 m)
- Time zone: UTC-6 (Central (CST))
  - Summer (DST): UTC-5 (CDT)
- Area code: 320
- GNIS feature ID: 652868

Svea is an unincorporated community, in Whitefield Township, Kandiyohi County, Minnesota, United States. The town does not appear on the U.S. Census Bureau website, but the population is roughly 100.

== Geography ==
The community of Svea is quite small, spanning only three blocks. Svea Lutheran Church stands at the center of the town. The community mainly consists of dirt roads, except for County Road 11 which is the 'Main Street.' The surrounding area is mainly farmland, with occasional wooded groves and lakes. Big Kandiyohi Lake lies to the east of the community. The largest nearby town is Willmar, approximately 10 miles north.
