= Tom Peterson =

American retailer (1930–2016)

- Born: Thomas Howard Peterson; February 23, 1930; St. Paul, Minnesota, U.S.
- Died: July 25, 2016 (aged 86); Portland, Oregon, U.S.
- Resting place: Lincoln Memorial Park & Funeral Home
- Occupation: Retailer
- Known for: Television personality
- Spouse: Gloria Peterson (m. 1952–2016)
- Children: 2

Thomas Howard Peterson (February 23, 1930 – July 25, 2016) was an American retailer, pitchman, and television personality from Portland, Oregon. Peterson opened his first store in 1964, which grew to a regional consumer electronics, home appliance, and furniture chain in the 1970s. His memorable television commercials and unusual promotions made him a widely recognized personality in the Portland area by the 1980s, leading to several cameo appearances in the films of Gus Van Sant.

In the early 1990s, having acquired and been unable to successfully integrate a competing chain of electronics stores, Peterson filed for bankruptcy protection before reemerging as a scaled-down furniture retailer that offered minimal electronics. He continued appearing in his own commercials into the early 2000s, and the store's final location closed in February 2009.

== Early life ==
Peterson was born outside St. Paul, Minnesota, where he grew up on a farm, the son of a federal government worker. He studied business at the University of Minnesota. Peterson met his future wife Gloria, also from the St. Paul area, at a Lutheran church camp at Green Lake in northern Minnesota at the age of 14. The two were married on September 20, 1952.

== Tom Peterson's ==
=== Founding and expansion ===
Peterson spent ten years working at the Jolly Green Giant Co., rising to eastern regional manager in charge of 17 food processing plants in the United States and Canada. However, the western regional manager was the son of the company's president, so in 1963 Peterson obtained a franchise from Muntz television, sold his home for $10,000 USD, which he put into the business, and moved with Gloria to Portland on the advice of friends.

He opened his first store at Southeast 82nd and Foster Road in 1964. Peterson paid himself a salary of $100 a week and $50 a week to Gloria, who was the controller of the business. In 1964, his first year in business, Peterson had revenues of $300,000. By 1989, Peterson was selling $30 million per year. It was during this period that Peterson first achieved fame in Portland and throughout the Pacific Northwest.

By the early 1980s, Peterson had become one of the largest home electronics dealerships in Portland, alongside Smith's Home Furnishings, Stereo Super Stores, Montgomery Ward and Sears. Peterson went on to open stores in Eugene, Gresham, Hillsboro, North Portland and as far away as Spokane, Washington, but later closed these stores, citing an inability to offer the personal service by appearing on the floor alongside his sales staff. The Petersons' children also worked in the business, daughter Kathy as a personnel manager and son Keith as a partner in an affiliated electronics import-export business, operating out of Boston.

=== Bankruptcy and reorganization ===
In September 1989, Peterson outbid two challengers to acquire Stereo Super Stores, whose parent company had filed for bankruptcy the month before, paying $940,000 plus another $1,000,000 for inventory. The acquisition included a car stereo specialty shop at Mall 205, Car Stereo East. Peterson continued to operate the franchise's locations at Jantzen Beach and Washington Square Too without a branding change until March 1991, when he renamed them Tom Peterson Super Stores, as he did his original home electronics store at 82nd and Foster. Peterson explained that the original stores were performing better than the newly acquired outlets, so he decided to combine them. His other two stores and car specialty store were unaffected.

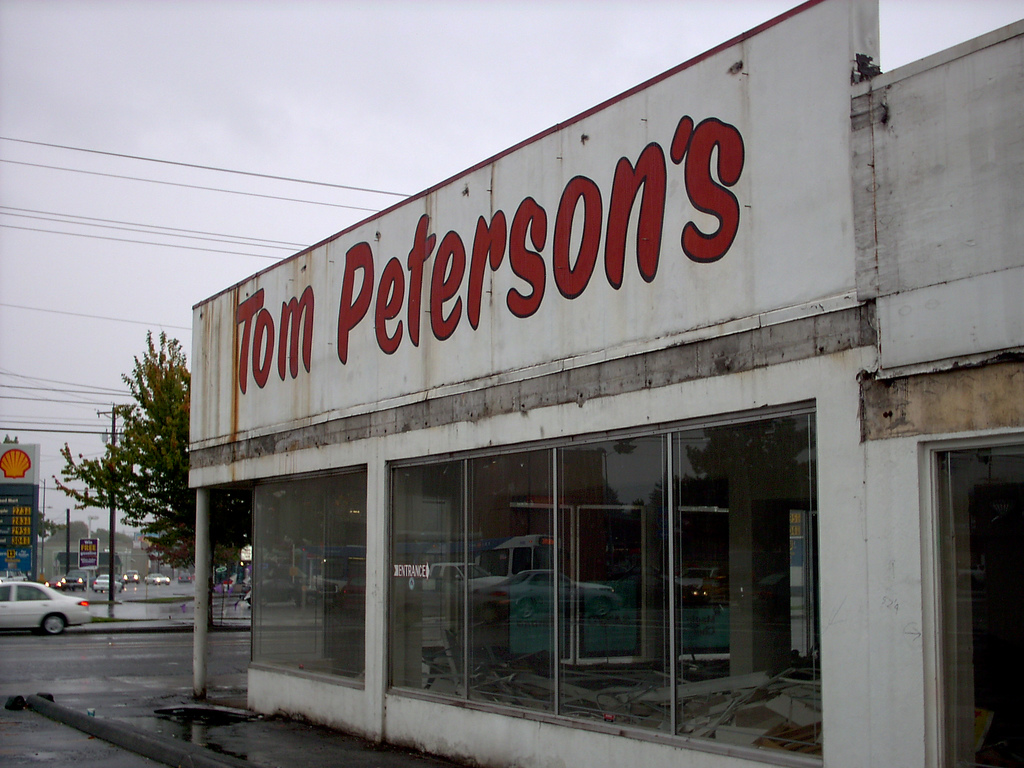
The former Tom Peterson's store at the corner of SE 82nd and Foster.

In August 1991, Peterson closed his Jantzen Beach location and in October filed for Chapter 11 bankruptcy protection, listing liabilities of $7.5 million owed to 283 creditors on assets of $2.7 million. He also faced lawsuits from suppliers and AT&T Commercial Finance. At the time of the filing, Peterson said: "I should have listened to my wife. She said, 'Don't buy Stereo Super Stores.' She was right." Peterson said sales shrank 16 percent in the company's 1991 fiscal year compared to 1990, and that his business had been in the red every month but one in the 25 months since the buyout. Peterson said at the time: "They should have been called Stereo Stupid Stores."

Peterson closed his furniture store at 82nd and Foster, consolidating all operations in his two remaining stores, but kept his ads on the air. At Gloria's suggestion, immediate subsequent television spots referred to the bankruptcy, spelling out the troubles and asking customers to please buy today. A crisis manager took control of operations, leaving Peterson to work the sales floors until the stores closed in March 1992. Peterson said in 1995, "The big nationals make it very tough on the regional, like Smith's, and on the locals, like us." However, Peterson did not lay all of the blame on national retailers, saying "In life, we are all carpenters of our own crosses. Don't blame someone else."

=== Tom Peterson & Gloria's Too! ===
Sign outside last Tom Peterson's location in late 2008.

In September 1992, Peterson reopened for business at his original location, an 11,000-square-foot (1,000 m^{2}) showroom at 8130 Southeast Foster Road, under the name Tom Peterson & Gloria's Too! Peterson's son-in-law Robert Condon became president, daughter Kathy the store's accountant and Gloria Peterson resumed duties as chief financial officer. Peterson himself remained the primary public face of the company, and resumed his familiar advertising. Condon raised a portion of the new venture's seed money from the sale of Tom Peterson memorabilia, having bought hundreds of wristwatches and alarm clocks from the bankruptcy trustee, then reselling them at a profit.

By 1995, Peterson and a staff of 18 were selling $5 million worth of household durables per year, having shown a profit in 23 of 25 years. As of 2002, Peterson was working "part time" 44 hours per week, half of what he once had put in, and booking $4 million in sales per year. In the mid-2000s, the Petersons sold their last remaining property at the corner of Southeast 82nd and Foster and moved the store to a side street a block away, just off 82nd Avenue. The final location closed on February 28, 2009.

== Television advertising ==
Peterson is widely known in Portland for writing and starring in his own local TV commercials, for his trademark flattop haircut, catch phrases including "That's Tom Peterson's!", "Free is a very good price" and referring to his store as "the happy place to buy." In the 1980s, Peterson was described by Oregonian columnist Margie Boulé as "arguably, the most recognizable man in Portland." From the 1960s, Peterson was a frequent sponsor of KPTV's Portland Wrestling programs and often appeared live at the now defunct Portland Sports Arena to advertise items from his store. He advertised regularly on Portland Wrestling until the show was cancelled in 1991.

Peterson's most famous commercials were his late night "Wake up! Wake up!" spots, which began airing in the mid-1970s. Peterson borrowed the idea from another retailer in Corpus Christi, Texas. Said Peterson, "Somebody told me about it and I followed it up. Ours was much more successful than theirs. They didn't have the store owner or a strong personality doing theirs." Peterson kept his stores open from 11 a.m. to 3 a.m. to accommodate customers inspired by the ad to visit his store late at night. The "Wake up!" commercials continued to run through the 1980s, though less frequently, and last aired in 1988.

In 1987, Peterson experimented with hiring an outside firm to produce a series of commercials, a first in 23 years on the air. The new commercials parodied daytime soap operas, featuring a housewife named Monica whose domestic problems are solved by merchandise from Peterson's stores.

Commenting on his television advertisements in 1987, Peterson said: "It's probably the best-known commercial in town, but not the best-liked one." Peterson continued to write and star in his own commercials into the early 2000s.

== Special promotions ==
=== Tom Peterson haircuts ===
In July 1986, Peterson offered a free flattop haircut to anyone who attended the opening of his third store at 82nd and Foster. Peterson, who got his first flattop haircut in 1952, hired three barbers to give haircuts on the floor of his showrooms. They gave about 50 haircuts the first day, and Peterson decided to make the gimmick a weekly event. He continued offering free haircuts for the next two decades and as of 2002 was still giving away about ten haircuts per week.

=== Halloween masks ===
Starting Halloween 1986, Peterson offered visitors free cardboard masks with his face on it. All 5,000 went in a single year. In 1987, Peterson said, "We thought about doing a better mask, with a more realistic Tom Peterson on it. But then we thought, what if somebody robs a bank wearing one, and the witnesses say, 'It was Tom Peterson!' So we're sticking with the black and white cardboard."

=== Alarm clocks ===
A Tom Peterson alarm clock in 2009

In October 1990, after he had ceased running the "Wake up!" TV spots, Peterson debuted an alarm clock in the shape of a television set with his face in the center and voice as the alarm, saying: "Wake up! Wake up to a happy day!" Peterson said of the promotion at the time: "If you can put your face in 5,000 homes in Portland, it certainly can't hurt."

=== Wristwatches ===
Peterson has cited as his most successful promotion the Tom Peterson watch, also featuring his face. Peterson said in 1988: "It particularly went well with college youth. They're a big thing on campus. I guess it's kind of a cult thing." Northwest native Kurt Cobain wore a Tom Peterson wristwatch, as did David Foraker, the attorney representing the creditors in Peterson's bankruptcy case.

=== Other promotions ===
Other Peterson giveaways included hats, T-shirts, cups and coloring books. Peterson also turned a bus into a trolley that traveled a circuit around his parking lots on 82nd and Foster. To mark the tenth anniversary of Tom Peterson & Gloria's Too! and the couple's fiftieth wedding anniversary in September 2002, Peterson offered customers coffee mugs with photos of Tom and Gloria, fifty years ago and present day.

== In media ==
=== Film roles ===
Peterson has made three cameo appearances in the films of Gus Van Sant, and as of 1995 had appeared in more Van Sant films than any other actor. His first was Drugstore Cowboy, in which a Peterson commercial plays on the television. Van Sant later cast Peterson in a non-speaking role as a police chief in My Own Private Idaho and used another Peterson commercial in To Die For. Peterson also appeared in a small role as a parade commentator in Mr. Holland's Opus, which was filmed in Portland. Van Sant related to the Los Angeles Times, "So many people responded that I decided to keep using him." Van Sant and Peterson have used the same video editor, Wade Evans, and Van Sant bought his Magic Chef refrigerator from Peterson.

=== Celebrity appearances ===
Peterson served as the best man at a wedding planned by the "Morning Zoo" of radio station KKRZ (Z-100) FM in 1989. Professional wrestler Rowdy Roddy Piper officiated. Peterson, who had never met the 24-year-old groom, called him "a very nice young gentleman." He also played bongo drums on Where's the Art?, a public-access television cable TV show with Stephanie Pierce, proprietor of the 24 Hour Church of Elvis.

=== Tom Peterson art ===
Peterson is the subject of several works by Portland artist Norman Forsberg. They include the 1989 painting "Sphinxface" and "Six Toms and a Bob", pairing Peterson's face with that of Bob the Weather Cat, then a fixture of KATU local news. Forsberg, on Peterson: "Most pop icons are entertainers or athletes. Whereas he's someone selling televisions. That says something."

Peterson's face was also appropriated by Portland stencil artists who spray-painted graffiti with the caption "Trust Tom", often modifying pre-existing "Trust Jesus" graffiti by adding Peterson's name and face.

Tom Peterson’s face icon and name appear on several stores in the comic book Boris the Bear #2, published by Portland company Dark Horse Comics and created by Portland artist James Dean Smith.

=== In music ===
In 1987, Z-100 radio personality Dan Clark and musician Roger Sause wrote a song, "I Woke Up with a Tom Peterson Haircut", which featured a singing part for Peterson. The station sold 5,000 copies of the single, donating the proceeds to charity, and continued running the song into the 1990s. In addition to wearing a Tom Peterson wristwatch, Nirvana lead singer Kurt Cobain also was photographed wearing a Tom Peterson T-shirt at live concerts.

== Personal life ==
During his bankruptcy, Peterson started a second business as a motivational speaker, which he continued until 2001. Peterson lived with his wife in a one-story Craftsman-style home in Happy Valley, Oregon. He was a fan of upland bird hunting, specifically the chukar. In later years, he suffered from Parkinson's disease. He died on July 25, 2016, at the age of 86.
