= Harry Levine Wahlstrand =

American politician (1890–1962)

Harry Levine Wahlstrand (March 24, 1890 – February 21, 1962) was an American educator and politician.

Wahlstrand was born in Fahlun Township, Kandiyohi County, Minnesota and went to the local Minnesota public schools. He went to the University of Birmingham in England and to the Northwestern Junior College in Fergus Falls, Minnesota. He graduated from Gustavus Adolphus College in 1917 and then served in the United States Army during World War I. Wahlstrand was a social studies and history teacher in Willmar, Minnesota and at the Taylors Falls High School in Taylors Falls, Minnesota. He lived in Willmar, Minnesota with his wife and family. Wahlstrand served in the Minnesota House of Representatives from 1929 to 1936 and in the Minnesota Senate from 1939 until his death in 1962. On October 2, 1960, Wahlstrand suffered a cerebral hemorrhage which caused his death.
