= Monongalia County =

Monongalia County has been the name of two counties in the United States:

- Monongalia County, West Virginia
- Monongalia County, Minnesota, dissolved in 1871
