= Hefta Lake =

Lake in the state of Minnesota, United States

- Location within Minnesota Location within the United States
- Location: Kandiyohi County, Minnesota
- Coordinates: 45°22′29″N 95°14′16″W
- Type: lake
- Basin countries: United States
- Surface area: 100 acres (40 ha)
- Max. depth: 10 ft (3.0 m)
- Surface elevation: 1,210 ft (370 m)

Hefta Lake is a lake in Kandiyohi County, in the U.S. state of Minnesota.

Hefta Lake was named for Mrs. Marie Hefta, a pioneer who settled there.

== See also ==
- List of lakes in Minnesota
