= Glesne Lake =

Lake in the state of Minnesota, United States

- Location within Minnesota Location within the United States
- Location: Kandiyohi County, Minnesota
- Coordinates: 45°21′46″N 95°11′21″W
- Type: lake
- Basin countries: United States
- Surface elevation: 1,230 ft (375 m)

Glesne Lake is a lake in Kandiyohi County, in the U.S. state of Minnesota.

Glesne Lake was named for Even O. Glesne, a pioneer who settled there.

== See also ==
- List of lakes in Minnesota
