= Reuben William Felt =

American politician (1903–1949)

Reuben William Felt (July 7, 1903 – June 12, 1949) was an American politician and farmer.

Felt was born in Fahlun Township Kandiyohi County, Minnesota and went to the University of Minnesota School of Agriculture. He lived with his wife and family, on a farm, in Willmar Township in Kandiyohi County, Minnesota. Felt raised cattle on the farm. Felt served as the Willmar Township clerk. He also served in the Minnesota House of Representatives from 1949 until his death on June 12, 1949.
