= Burbank Township, Kandiyohi County, Minnesota =

Burbank Township, Minnesota
- Township
- Location within Minnesota and the United States Burbank Township (the United States)
- Coordinates: 45°21′25″N 94°57′18″W
- Country: United States
- State: Minnesota
- County: Kandiyohi

Area
  - Total: 35.7 sq mi (92.5 km^{2})
  - Land: 32.9 sq mi (85.3 km^{2})
  - Water: 2.7 sq mi (7.1 km^{2})
- Elevation: 1,210 ft (370 m)

Population (2000)
  - Total: 510
  - Density: 16/sq mi (6/km^{2})
- Time zone: UTC-6 (Central (CST))
  - Summer (DST): UTC-5 (CDT)
- FIPS code: 27-08614
- GNIS feature ID: 0663703

Burbank Township is a township in Kandiyohi County, Minnesota, United States. The population was 510 at the 2000 census.

Burbank Township was organized in 1866, and named for Henry Clay Burbank, an area merchant.

== Geography ==
According to the United States Census Bureau, the township has a total area of 35.7 square miles (92 km^{2}), of which 33.0 square miles (85 km^{2}) is land and 2.8 square miles (7.3 km^{2}) (7.70%) is water.

== Demographics ==
As of the census of 2000, there were 510 people, 174 households, and 140 families residing in the township. The population density was 15.5 inhabitants per square mile (6.0/km^{2}). There were 186 housing units at an average density of 5.6 per square mile (2.2/km^{2}). The racial makeup of the township was 99.80% White, and 0.20% from two or more races.

There were 174 households, out of which 40.8% had children under the age of 18 living with them, 72.4% were married couples living together, 2.3% had a female householder with no husband present, and 19.0% were non-families. 14.9% of all households were made up of individuals, and 2.3% had someone living alone who was 65 years of age or older. The average household size was 2.93 and the average family size was 3.30.

In the township the population was spread out, with 31.0% under the age of 18, 8.8% from 18 to 24, 32.7% from 25 to 44, 21.8% from 45 to 64, and 5.7% who were 65 years of age or older. The median age was 32 years. For every 100 females, there were 126.7 males. For every 100 females age 18 and over, there were 121.4 males.

The median income for a household in the township was $43,375, and the median income for a family was $45,455. Males had a median income of $30,833 versus $22,917 for females. The per capita income for the township was $20,587. About 3.5% of families and 5.6% of the population were below the poverty line, including 6.1% of those under age 18 and none of those age 65 or over.
