= Colfax Township, Kandiyohi County, Minnesota =

Colfax Township, Minnesota
- Township
- Location within Minnesota and the United States Colfax Township (the United States)
- Coordinates: 45°21′36″N 95°3′49″W
- Country: United States
- State: Minnesota
- County: Kandiyohi

Area
  - Total: 35.9 sq mi (93.0 km^{2})
  - Land: 32.8 sq mi (84.9 km^{2})
  - Water: 3.1 sq mi (8.1 km^{2})
- Elevation: 1,250 ft (381 m)

Population (2000)
  - Total: 557
  - Density: 17/sq mi (6.6/km^{2})
- Time zone: UTC-6 (Central (CST))
  - Summer (DST): UTC-5 (CDT)
- FIPS code: 27-12538
- GNIS feature ID: 0663846

Colfax Township is a township in Kandiyohi County, Minnesota, United States. The population was 557 at the 2000 census.

Colfax Township was organized in 1871, and named for Schuyler Colfax, 17th Vice President of the United States.

== Geography ==
According to the United States Census Bureau, the township has a total area of 35.9 square miles (93 km^{2}), of which 32.8 square miles (85 km^{2}) is land and 3.1 square miles (8.0 km^{2}) (8.69%) is water.

== Demographics ==
As of the census of 2000, there were 557 people, 210 households, and 165 families residing in the township. The population density was 17.0 inhabitants per square mile (6.6/km^{2}). There were 314 housing units at an average density of 9.6 per square mile (3.7/km^{2}). The racial makeup of the township was 98.03% White, 0.54% African American, 0.18% Native American, 0.18% Asian, 0.18% Pacific Islander, 0.18% from other races, and 0.72% from two or more races. Hispanic or Latino of any race were 0.72% of the population.

There were 210 households, out of which 35.2% had children under the age of 18 living with them, 69.5% were married couples living together, 5.2% had a female householder with no husband present, and 21.0% were non-families. 18.6% of all households were made up of individuals, and 5.2% had someone living alone who was 65 years of age or older. The average household size was 2.64 and the average family size was 3.00.

In the township the population was spread out, with 25.0% under the age of 18, 9.3% from 18 to 24, 26.9% from 25 to 44, 26.8% from 45 to 64, and 12.0% who were 65 years of age or older. The median age was 39 years. For every 100 females, there were 115.9 males. For every 100 females age 18 and over, there were 111.1 males.

The median income for a household in the township was $41,417, and the median income for a family was $43,854. Males had a median income of $32,969 versus $22,639 for females. The per capita income for the township was $16,654. About 4.9% of families and 6.1% of the population were below the poverty line, including 8.6% of those under age 18 and none of those age 65 or over.
