= Lake Lillian Township, Kandiyohi County, Minnesota =

Lake Lillian Township, Minnesota
- Township
- Location within Minnesota and the United States Lake Lillian Township (the United States)
- Coordinates: 44°55′43″N 94°56′12″W
- Country: United States
- State: Minnesota
- County: Kandiyohi

Area
  - Total: 36.2 sq mi (93.7 km^{2})
  - Land: 35.6 sq mi (92.3 km^{2})
  - Water: 0.58 sq mi (1.5 km^{2})
- Elevation: 1,120 ft (340 m)

Population (2000)
  - Total: 221
  - Density: 6.2/sq mi (2.4/km^{2})
- Time zone: UTC-6 (Central (CST))
  - Summer (DST): UTC-5 (CDT)
- ZIP code: 56253
- Area code: 320
- FIPS code: 27-34694
- GNIS feature ID: 0664688

Lake Lillian Township is a township in Kandiyohi County, Minnesota, United States. The population was 221 at the 2000 census. The township is named after the wife of Edwin Whitefield, Lillian. Edwin came and explored the area in 1856 and created paintings of it.

== Geography ==
According to the United States Census Bureau, the township has a total area of 36.2 square miles (94 km^{2}), of which 35.6 square miles (92 km^{2}) is land and 0.6 square miles (1.6 km^{2}) (1.58%) is water.

== Demographics ==
As of the census of 2000, there were 221 people, 86 households, and 57 families residing in the township. The population density was 6.2 inhabitants per square mile (2.4/km^{2}). There were 95 housing units at an average density of 2.7 per square mile (1.0/km^{2}). The racial makeup of the township was 97.74% White, 0.45% African American, 0.45% Native American, 0.45% Asian, and 0.90% from two or more races. Hispanic or Latino of any race were 3.62% of the population.

There were 86 households, out of which 31.4% had children under the age of 18 living with them, 65.1% were married couples living together, 2.3% had a female householder with no husband present, and 32.6% were non-families. 27.9% of all households were made up of individuals, and 17.4% had someone living alone who was 65 years of age or older. The average household size was 2.57 and the average family size was 3.21.

In the township the population was spread out, with 27.1% under the age of 18, 6.8% from 18 to 24, 23.5% from 25 to 44, 23.1% from 45 to 64, and 19.5% who were 65 years of age or older. The median age was 41 years. For every 100 females, there were 112.5 males. For every 100 females age 18 and over, there were 106.4 males.

The median income for a household in the township was $40,000, and the median income for a family was $46,000. Males had a median income of $30,000 versus $20,000 for females. The per capita income for the township was $18,203. About 3.2% of families and 2.7% of the population were below the poverty line, including none of those under the age of eighteen and 4.4% of those 65 or over.
