= East Lake Lillian Township, Kandiyohi County, Minnesota =

East Lake Lillian Township, Minnesota
- Township
- Location within Minnesota and the United States East Lake Lillian Township (the United States)
- Coordinates: 44°56′47″N 94°50′0″W
- Country: United States
- State: Minnesota
- County: Kandiyohi

Area
  - Total: 35.9 sq mi (92.9 km^{2})
  - Land: 33.6 sq mi (87.1 km^{2})
  - Water: 2.2 sq mi (5.8 km^{2})
- Elevation: 1,106 ft (337 m)

Population (2000)
  - Total: 225
  - Density: 6.7/sq mi (2.6/km^{2})
- Time zone: UTC-6 (Central (CST))
  - Summer (DST): UTC-5 (CDT)
- FIPS code: 27-17702
- GNIS feature ID: 0664031

East Lake Lillian Township is a township in Kandiyohi County, Minnesota, United States. The population was 225 at the 2000 census.

East Lake Lillian Township was organized in 1893, and named for its location east of Lake Lillian.

== Geography ==
According to the United States Census Bureau, the township has a total area of 35.9 square miles (93 km^{2}), of which 33.6 square miles (87 km^{2}) is land and 2.2 square miles (5.7 km^{2}) (6.27%) is water.

== Demographics ==
At the 2000 census, there were 225 people, 91 households, and 62 families residing in the township. The population density was 6.7 per square mile (2.6/km^{2}). There were 102 housing units at an average density of 3.0/sq mi (1.2/km^{2}). The racial makeup of the township was 100.00% White.

There were 91 households, of which 31.9% had children under the age of 18 living with them, 58.2% were married couples living together, 4.4% had a female householder with no husband present, and 30.8% were non-families. 23.1% of all households were made up of individuals, and 8.8% had someone living alone who was 65 years of age or older. The average household size was 2.47 and the average family size was 2.94.

Age distribution was 24.0% under the age of 18, 6.2% from 18 to 24, 33.8% from 25 to 44, 20.0% from 45 to 64, and 16.0% who were 65 years of age or older. he median age was 38 years. For every 100 females, there were 112.3 males. For every 100 females age 18 and over, there were 125.0 males.

The median household income was $39,750, and the median family income was $46,250. Males had a median income of $32,143 versus $16,875 for females. The per capita income for the township was $17,621. About 8.3% of families and 7.6% of the population were below the poverty line, including 8.1% of those under the age of eighteen and 10.3% of those 65 or over.
