= Nest Lake =

Lake in the state of Minnesota, United States

- Location within Minnesota
- Location: Kandiyohi County, Minnesota
- Coordinates: 45°15′35″N 94°58′3″W
- Type: lake
- Primary inflows: Crow River
- River sources: Crow River
- Primary outflows: Old Mill Inn Dam
- Islands: 2

Nest Lake is a lake in Kandiyohi County, in the U.S. state of Minnesota.

Nest Lake was named for the many nests of double-crested cormorants once seen there by early settlers.

Nest lake's major inlet is the Crow River. The lakes major outlet is Old Mill Inn Dam which drains into Green Lake.

The lake is home to two islands.

== Organisms ==
=== Fish ===
Some species of fish in the lake include; largemouth bass, smallmouth bass, crappie, walleyes, sunfish, and northern pike

== Recreational Activities ==
Visitors to the lake are able to kayak, fish, swim, and boat, along with many other activities. A Girl Scout camp, Camp Sanderson, is located along the lake's shore. The Glacial Lakes State Trail has a bridge that runs over a narrow part of the lake. Nest Lake borders the Ringo-Nest State Wildlife Management Park.

== Resorts ==
Nest Lake is home to many resorts. These include; Peaceful Oaks Resort and Island View Resort.

== See also ==
- List of lakes in Minnesota
- Freshwater Lakes
