= Roy C. Jensen =

American politician (1909–2011)

Roy C. Jensen (August 7, 1909 – March 6, 2011) was an American farmer and politician.

Born in Willmar, Minnesota, Jensen owned a dairy farm near Priam, Minnesota. He was also president of a cooperative telephone company. Jensen also served on the school and township boards. He served in the Minnesota House of Representatives from 1951 until 1954 and was a Republican. He died in Willmar, Minnesota.
