= Sibley State Park =

- Sibley State Park CCC/Rustic Style Historic District
- U.S. National Register of Historic Places
- U.S. Historic district
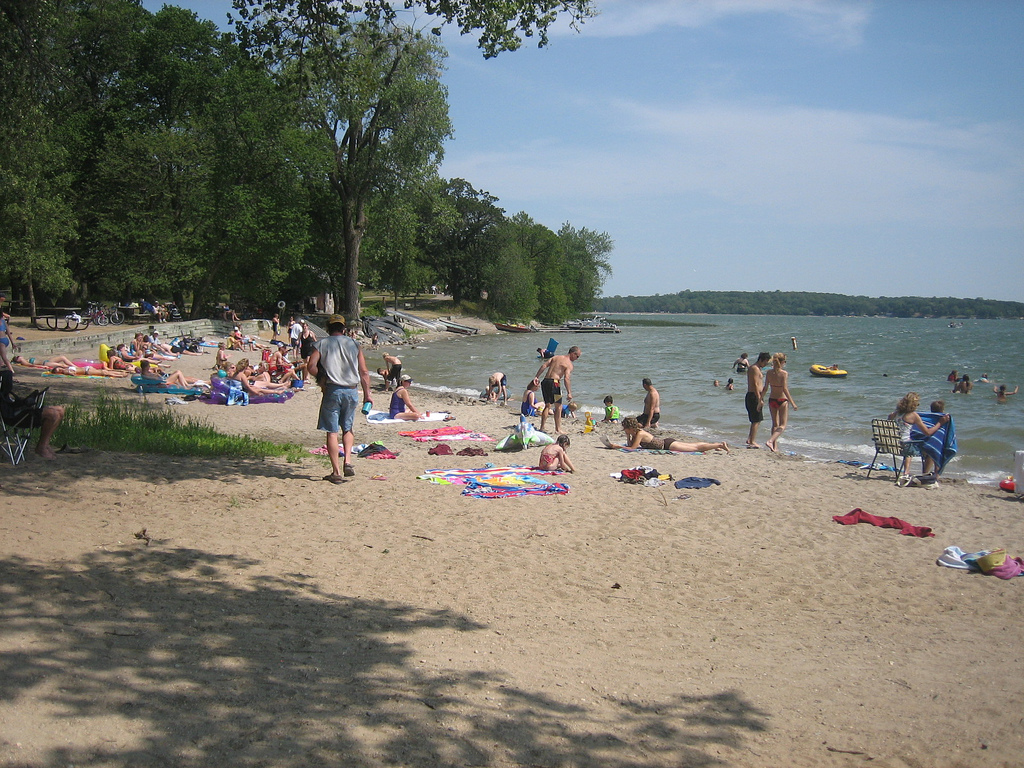
- Beach at Sibley State Park

- Location within Minnesota Location within the United States
- Location: Kandiyohi County, Minnesota, Off US 71 W of New London
- Nearest city: New London, Minnesota
- Coordinates: 45°18′49″N 95°2′13″W
- Architect: Civilian Conservation Corps
- MPS: Minnesota State Park CCC/WPA/Rustic Style MPS
- NRHP reference No.: 89001673
- Added to NRHP: January 22, 1992

Sibley State Park is a Minnesota state park near New London, on the shores of Andrew Lake. It is named for Henry Hastings Sibley, the first governor of the state. A city park in Mankato, Minnesota is also named for Sibley.

The rustic style stone structures in the park were constructed by the Civilian Conservation Corps between 1935 and 1938. These structures are now listed on the National Register of Historic Places. The layout of the park was a very functional example of master planning because it reduced congestion and overcrowding for swimmers, picnickers, and campers. It is rumored that a secret cache of memorabilia and other various items are buried underground in one of the park areas near the beach.

== Wildlife ==
This park is home to mammalian species of white-tailed deer, red and gray foxes, coyote, raccoon, chipmunk, red and gray squirrels, mink, striped skunk, badger, and woodchuck. Bird watchers receive an opportunity to view ruffed grouse, great blue herons, egrets, wood ducks, Canada geese, scarlet tanagers, indigo buntings, pelicans, loons and bluebirds.
