= Willmar Township, Kandiyohi County, Minnesota =

Willmar Township, Minnesota
- Township
- Location within Minnesota and the United States Willmar Township (the United States)
- Coordinates: 45°6′36″N 95°4′58″W
- Country: United States
- State: Minnesota
- County: Kandiyohi

Area
  - Total: 23.1 sq mi (59.8 km^{2})
  - Land: 23.1 sq mi (59.7 km^{2})
  - Water: 0.039 sq mi (0.1 km^{2})
- Elevation: 1,129 ft (344 m)

Population (2000)
  - Total: 661
  - Density: 29/sq mi (11.1/km^{2})
- Time zone: UTC-6 (Central (CST))
  - Summer (DST): UTC-5 (CDT)
- ZIP code: 56201
- Area code: 320
- FIPS code: 27-70438
- GNIS feature ID: 0666000

Willmar Township is a township in Kandiyohi County, Minnesota, United States. The population was 661 at the 2000 census.

== History ==
Willmar Township was organized in 1870, and named for Willmar, its largest settlement. Reuben William Felt (1903-1949), Minnesota state legislator and farmer, lived in Willmar Township.

== Geography ==
According to the United States Census Bureau, the township has a total area of 23.1 square miles (59.8 km^{2}), of which 23.0 square miles (59.6 km^{2}) is land and 0.1 square mile (0.2 km^{2}) (0.26%) is water.

== Demographics ==
As of the census of 2000, there were 661 people, 170 households, and 131 families residing in the township. The population density was 28.7 inhabitants per square mile (11.1/km^{2}). There were 175 housing units at an average density of 7.6/sq mi (2.9/km^{2}). The racial makeup of the township was 94.70% White, 0.76% African American, 1.36% Native American, 1.21% Asian, 0.30% from other races, and 1.66% from two or more races. Hispanic or Latino of any race were 8.02% of the population.

There were 170 households, out of which 38.8% had children under the age of 18 living with them, 67.6% were married couples living together, 7.1% had a female householder with no husband present, and 22.4% were non-families. 19.4% of all households were made up of individuals, and 7.1% had someone living alone who was 65 years of age or older. The average household size was 2.88 and the average family size was 3.29.

In the township the population was spread out, with 32.5% under the age of 18, 10.3% from 18 to 24, 25.7% from 25 to 44, 22.5% from 45 to 64, and 8.9% who were 65 years of age or older. The median age was 32 years. For every 100 females, there were 122.6 males. For every 100 females age 18 and over, there were 120.8 males.

The median income for a household in the township was $44,688, and the median income for a family was $48,750. Males had a median income of $32,083 versus $25,500 for females. The per capita income for the township was $15,732. About 8.5% of families and 12.2% of the population were below the poverty line, including 16.3% of those under age 18 and 18.0% of those age 65 or over.
