= Green Lake Township, Kandiyohi County, Minnesota =

Green Lake Township, Minnesota
- Township
- Location within Minnesota and the United States Green Lake Township (the United States)
- Coordinates: 45°12′27″N 94°56′19″W
- Country: United States
- State: Minnesota
- County: Kandiyohi

Area
  - Total: 34.2 sq mi (88.7 km^{2})
  - Land: 30.4 sq mi (78.8 km^{2})
  - Water: 3.8 sq mi (9.8 km^{2})
- Elevation: 1,198 ft (365 m)

Population (2000)
  - Total: 1,473
  - Density: 48/sq mi (18.7/km^{2})
- Time zone: UTC-6 (Central (CST))
  - Summer (DST): UTC-5 (CDT)
- FIPS code: 27-25694
- GNIS feature ID: 0664342

Green Lake Township is a township in Kandiyohi County, Minnesota, United States. The population was 1,473 at the 2000 census.

Green Lake Township was organized in 1868, and named for its Green Lake.

== Geography ==
According to the United States Census Bureau, the township has a total area of 34.2 square miles (89 km^{2}), of which 30.4 square miles (79 km^{2}) is land and 3.8 square miles (9.8 km^{2}) (11.07%) is water.

== Demographics ==
As of the census of 2000, there were 1,473 people, 551 households, and 454 families residing in the township. The population density was 48.4 inhabitants per square mile (18.7/km^{2}). There were 696 housing units at an average density of 22.9 per square mile (8.8/km^{2}). The racial makeup of the township was 98.85% White, 0.07% African American, 0.07% Native American, 0.20% Asian, 0.68% from other races, and 0.14% from two or more races. Hispanic or Latino of any race were 0.88% of the population.

There were 551 households, out of which 37.0% had children under the age of 18 living with them, 75.0% were married couples living together, 4.4% had a female householder with no husband present, and 17.6% were non-families. 15.4% of all households were made up of individuals, and 4.2% had someone living alone who was 65 years of age or older. The average household size was 2.67 and the average family size was 2.97.

In the township the population was spread out, with 26.3% under the age of 18, 6.2% from 18 to 24, 26.5% from 25 to 44, 30.7% from 45 to 64, and 10.3% who were 65 years of age or older. The median age was 41 years. For every 100 females, there were 97.7 males. For every 100 females age 18 and over, there were 97.8 males.

The median income for a household in the township was $51,688, and the median income for a family was $57,422. Males had a median income of $38,667 versus $25,446 for females. The per capita income for the township was $25,535. About 1.4% of families and 2.2% of the population were below the poverty line, including 1.6% of those under age 18 and 7.5% of those age 65 or over.
