= Endresen =

Endresen is a surname. Notable people with the surname include:

- Egil Endresen (1920–1992), Norwegian judge and politician
- Gabriel Endresen Moseid (1882–1961), Norwegian politician
- Sidsel Endresen (born 1952), Norwegian singer, composer, and actress
- Tor Endresen (born 1959), Norwegian singer and composer

== See also ==
- Endreson
