= Spicer, Minnesota =

City in Minnesota, United States

Spicer
- City
- Mottoes: "Spicer is Nicer" and "Explore Spicer"
- Location of Spicer, Minnesota
- Coordinates: 45°13′59″N 94°56′24″W
- Country: United States
- State: Minnesota
- County: Kandiyohi

Area
  - Total: 1.20 sq mi (3.12 km^{2})
  - Land: 1.20 sq mi (3.10 km^{2})
  - Water: 0.0077 sq mi (0.02 km^{2})
- Elevation: 1,171 ft (357 m)

Population (2020)
  - Total: 1,112
  - Density: 928.9/sq mi (358.66/km^{2})
- Time zone: UTC-6 (Central (CST))
  - Summer (DST): UTC-5 (CDT)
- ZIP code: 56288
- Area code: 320
- FIPS code: 27-61690
- GNIS feature ID: 2395925
- Website: https://cityofspicer.com/

Spicer is a city in Kandiyohi County, Minnesota, United States situated on Green Lake. As of the 2020 census, Spicer had a population of 1,112. Sibley State Park and many surrounding lakes are nearby.

== History ==
Spicer was platted in 1886, and named for John M. Spicer, the original owner of the town site. A post office has been in operation at Spicer since 1886.

== Geography ==
Nest Lake in Spicer - June 2008

According to the United States Census Bureau, the city has an area of 1.15 square miles (2.98 km^{2}), of which 1.14 square miles (2.95 km^{2}) is land and 0.01 square miles (0.03 km^{2}) is water. Minnesota State Highway 23 serves as a main route in the city, and U.S. Route 71 is nearby.

== Demographics ==
Historical population
Census	Pop.	Note	%±
1910	228		—
1920	299		31.1%
1930	290		−3.0%
1940	480		65.5%
1950	566		17.9%
1960	589		4.1%
1970	586		−0.5%
1980	909		55.1%
1990	1,020		12.2%
2000	1,129		10.7%
2010	1,167		3.4%
2020	1,112		−4.7%
U.S. Decennial Census

=== 2010 census ===
As of the census of 2010, there were 1,167 people, 520 households, and 312 families residing in the city. The population density was 1,023.7 inhabitants per square mile (395.3/km^{2}). There were 621 housing units at an average density of 544.7 per square mile (210.3/km^{2}). The racial makeup of the city was 98.2% White, 0.1% African American, 0.4% Native American, 0.2% Asian, 0.2% from other races, and 0.9% from two or more races. Hispanic or Latino of any race were 4.1% of the population.

There were 520 households, of which 27.3% had children under the age of 18 living with them, 47.7% were married couples living together, 9.6% had a female householder with no husband present, 2.7% had a male householder with no wife present, and 40.0% were non-families. 34.8% of all households were made up of individuals, and 15.7% had someone living alone who was 65 years of age or older. The average household size was 2.20 and the average family size was 2.85.

The median age in the city was 40.4 years. 22.7% of residents were under the age of 18; 7.1% were between the ages of 18 and 24; 25.3% were from 25 to 44; 26.1% were from 45 to 64; and 18.9% were 65 years of age or older. The gender makeup of the city was 48.8% male and 51.2% female.

=== 2000 census ===
As of the census of 2000, there were 1,126 people residing in the city. The population density was 1,038.4 inhabitants per square mile (400.9/km^{2}). There were 605 housing units at an average density of 557.9 per square mile (215.4/km^{2}). The racial makeup of the city was 98.76% White, 0.18% African American, 0.18% Native American, 0.09% Asian, 0.36% from other races, and 0.44% from two or more races. Hispanic or Latino of any race were 0.71% of the population.

There were 528 households, out of which 26.1% had children under the age of 18 living with them, 46.8% were married couples living together, 8.5% had a female householder with no husband present, and 42.8% were non-families. 37.9% of all households were made up of individuals, and 21.0% had someone living alone who was 65 years of age or older. The average household size was 2.13 and the average family size was 2.82.

In the city, the population was spread out, with 21.3% under the age of 18, 9.4% from 18 to 24, 26.1% from 25 to 44, 22.6% from 45 to 64, and 20.6% who were 65 years of age or older. The median age was 41 years. For every 100 females, there were 92.2 males. For every 100 females age 18 and over, there were 86.9 males.

The median income for a household in the city was $33,913, and the median income for a family was $48,542. Males had a median income of $36,477 versus $24,219 for females. The per capita income for the city was $21,103. About 5.5% of families and 8.7% of the population were below the poverty line, including 6.8% of those under the age of 18 and 13.5% of those 65 and older.
