= Priam, Minnesota =

Unincorporated community in Minnesota, United States

Priam
- Unincorporated community
- Location within Minnesota Location within the United States
- Coordinates: 45°04′06″N 95°08′27″W
- Country: United States
- State: Minnesota
- County: Kandiyohi
- Township: St. Johns
- Elevation: 1,109 ft (338 m)
- Time zone: UTC-6 (Central (CST))
  - Summer (DST): UTC-5 (CDT)
- Area code: 320
- GNIS feature ID: 654893

Priam is an unincorporated community in Kandiyohi County, Minnesota, United States.

== Notable person ==
- Roy C. Jensen, Minnesota legislator and farmer, owned a dairy farm near Priam.
