= Lake Elizabeth Township, Minnesota =

- Township
- Location within Minnesota and the United States Lake Elizabeth Township (the United States)
- Coordinates: 45°2′N 94°48′W
- Country: United States
- State: Minnesota
- County: Kandiyohi

Area
  - Total: 36.0 sq mi (93.2 km^{2})
  - Land: 34.4 sq mi (89.2 km^{2})
  - Water: 1.5 sq mi (4.0 km^{2})
- Elevation: 1,119 ft (341 m)

Population (2000)
  - Total: 277
  - Density: 8.0/sq mi (3.1/km^{2})
- Time zone: UTC-6 (Central (CST))
  - Summer (DST): UTC-5 (CDT)
- FIPS code: 27-34226
- GNIS feature ID: 0664669

Lake Elizabeth Township is a township in Kandiyohi County, Minnesota, United States. The population was 277 at the 2000 census.

Lake Elizabeth Township was organized in 1869, and named for its Lake Elizabeth.

== Geography ==
According to the United States Census Bureau, the township has a total area of 36.0 square miles (93 km^{2}), of which 34.4 square miles (89 km^{2}) is land and 1.5 square miles (3.9 km^{2}) (4.25%) is water.

Lake Elizabeth Township is located in Township 118 North of the Arkansas Base Line and Range 33 West of the 5th Principal Meridian.

== Demographics ==
As of the census of 2000, there were 277 people, 89 households, and 70 families residing in the township. The population density was 8.0 inhabitants per square mile (3.1/km^{2}). There were 91 housing units at an average density of 2.6 per square mile (1.0/km^{2}). The racial makeup of the township was 94.95% White, 0.36% Native American, 3.61% from other races, and 1.08% from two or more races. Hispanic or Latino of any race were 3.97% of the population.

There were 89 households, out of which 32.6% had children under the age of 18 living with them, 62.9% were married couples living together, 5.6% had a female householder with no husband present, and 21.3% were non-families. 19.1% of all households were made up of individuals, and 9.0% had someone living alone who was 65 years of age or older. The average household size was 3.11 and the average family size was 3.50.

In the township the population was spread out, with 32.5% under the age of 18, 7.6% from 18 to 24, 22.7% from 25 to 44, 20.9% from 45 to 64, and 16.2% who were 65 years of age or older. The median age was 39 years. For every 100 females, there were 119.8 males. For every 100 females age 18 and over, there were 114.9 males.

The median income for a household in the township was $37,813, and the median income for a family was $39,688. Males had a median income of $30,893 versus $21,250 for females. The per capita income for the township was $15,365. About 7.0% of families and 9.3% of the population were below the poverty line, including 14.0% of those under the age of eighteen and none of those 65 or over.
