= Fahlun Township, Kandiyohi County, Minnesota =

Fahlun Township, Minnesota
- Township
- Location within Minnesota and the United States Fahlun Township (the United States)
- Coordinates: 45°1′39″N 94°56′11″W
- Country: United States
- State: Minnesota
- County: Kandiyohi

Area
  - Total: 36.0 sq mi (93.3 km^{2})
  - Land: 29.5 sq mi (76.4 km^{2})
  - Water: 6.5 sq mi (16.9 km^{2})
- Elevation: 1,109 ft (338 m)

Population (2000)
  - Total: 412
  - Density: 14/sq mi (5.4/km^{2})
- Time zone: UTC-6 (Central (CST))
  - Summer (DST): UTC-5 (CDT)
- FIPS code: 27-20150
- GNIS feature ID: 0664126

Fahlun Township is a township in Kandiyohi County, Minnesota, United States. The population was 412 at the 2000 census.

== History ==
Fahlun Township was organized in 1877, and named after Falun, in Sweden.

== Notable people ==
- Reuben William Felt (1903-1949), farmer and Minnesota state legislator, was born in Fahlun Township.
- Harry Levine Wahlstrand (1890-1962), educator and Minnesota state legislator, was born in Fahlun Township.

== Geography ==
According to the United States Census Bureau, the township has a total area of 36.0 square miles (93 km^{2}), of which 29.5 square miles (76 km^{2}) is land and 6.5 square miles (17 km^{2}) (18.16%) is water.

== Demographics ==
As of the census of 2000, there were 412 people, 157 households, and 114 families residing in the township. The population density was 14.0 inhabitants per square mile (5.4/km^{2}). There were 367 housing units at an average density of 12.4 per square mile (4.8/km^{2}). The racial makeup of the township was 95.87% White, 0.24% African American, 0.73% Native American, 0.97% Asian, and 2.18% from two or more races. Hispanic or Latino of any race were 0.24% of the population.

There were 157 households, out of which 33.8% had children under the age of 18 living with them, 66.2% were married couples living together, 3.8% had a female householder with no husband present, and 26.8% were non-families. 22.3% of all households were made up of individuals, and 6.4% had someone living alone who was 65 years of age or older. The average household size was 2.62 and the average family size was 2.97.

In the township the population was spread out, with 27.4% under the age of 18, 7.8% from 18 to 24, 24.8% from 25 to 44, 28.9% from 45 to 64, and 11.2% who were 65 years of age or older. The median age was 38 years. For every 100 females, there were 103.0 males. For every 100 females age 18 and over, there were 119.9 males.

The median income for a household in the township was $39,583, and the median income for a family was $42,679. Males had a median income of $26,250 versus $21,563 for females. The per capita income for the township was $16,221. About 8.1% of families and 5.8% of the population were below the poverty line, including 2.0% of those under age 18 and 3.8% of those age 65 or over.
