= Dovre Township, Kandiyohi County, Minnesota =

Dovre Township, Minnesota
- Township
- Location within Minnesota and the United States Dovre Township (the United States)
- Coordinates: 45°12′0″N 95°2′34″W
- Country: United States
- State: Minnesota
- County: Kandiyohi

Area
  - Total: 34.4 sq mi (89.2 km^{2})
  - Land: 27.2 sq mi (70.4 km^{2})
  - Water: 7.3 sq mi (18.8 km^{2})
- Elevation: 1,188 ft (362 m)

Population (2000)
  - Total: 1,968
  - Density: 73/sq mi (28/km^{2})
- Time zone: UTC-6 (Central (CST))
  - Summer (DST): UTC-5 (CDT)
- FIPS code: 27-16336
- GNIS feature ID: 0663999
- Website: http://www.dovretownship.com/

Dovre Township is a township in Kandiyohi County, Minnesota, United States. The population was 1,968 at the 2000 census.

Dovre Township was organized in 1869, and derives its name from the Dovrefjell mountain range in Norway.

== Geography ==
According to the United States Census Bureau, the township has a total area of 34.5 square miles (89 km^{2}), of which 27.2 square miles (70 km^{2}) is land and 7.3 square miles (19 km^{2}) (21.10%) is water.

== Demographics ==
As of the census of 2000, there were 1,968 people, 708 households, and 589 families residing in the township. The population density was 72.4 inhabitants per square mile (28.0/km^{2}). There were 736 housing units at an average density of 27.1 per square mile (10.5/km^{2}). The racial makeup of the township was 98.88% White, 0.36% African American, 0.10% Native American, 0.10% Asian, 0.15% from other races, and 0.41% from two or more races. Hispanic or Latino of any race were 0.97% of the population.

There were 708 households, out of which 38.3% had children under the age of 18 living with them, 79.1% were married couples living together, 2.5% had a female householder with no husband present, and 16.8% were non-families. 13.3% of all households were made up of individuals, and 4.4% had someone living alone who was 65 years of age or older. The average household size was 2.77 and the average family size was 3.05.

In the township the population was spread out, with 27.8% under the age of 18, 6.7% from 18 to 24, 24.8% from 25 to 44, 31.7% from 45 to 64, and 9.0% who were 65 years of age or older. The median age was 40 years. For every 100 females, there were 108.5 males. For every 100 females age 18 and over, there were 107.6 males.

The median income for a household in the township was $60,489, and the median income for a family was $65,774. Males had a median income of $41,920 versus $26,625 for females. The per capita income for the township was $25,824. About 2.1% of families and 4.7% of the population were below the poverty line, including 8.4% of those under age 18 and 5.2% of those age 65 or over.
