= Gennessee Township, Kandiyohi County, Minnesota =

Gennessee Township, Minnesota
- Township
- Location within Minnesota and the United States Gennessee Township (the United States)
- Coordinates: 45°7′N 94°49′W
- Country: United States
- State: Minnesota
- County: Kandiyohi

Area
  - Total: 34.9 sq mi (90.5 km^{2})
  - Land: 32.4 sq mi (83.9 km^{2})
  - Water: 2.5 sq mi (6.6 km^{2})
- Elevation: 1,234 ft (376 m)

Population (2000)
  - Total: 458
  - Density: 14/sq mi (5.5/km^{2})
- Time zone: UTC-6 (Central (CST))
  - Summer (DST): UTC-5 (CDT)
- ZIP code: 56209
- Area code: 320
- FIPS code: 27-23390
- GNIS feature ID: 0664256

Gennessee Township is a township in Kandiyohi County, Minnesota, United States. The population was 458 at the 2000 census. The township includes the city of Atwater.

Gennessee Township was organized in 1858, and named after the Genesee River in New York, the home state of a share of the early settlers.

== Geography ==
According to the United States Census Bureau, the township has a total area of 34.9 square miles (90 km^{2}), of which 32.4 square miles (84 km^{2}) is land and 2.5 square miles (6.5 km^{2}) (7.30%) is water.

Gennessee Township is located in Township 119 North of the Arkansas Base Line and Range 33 West of the 5th Principal Meridian.

== Demographics ==
As of the census of 2000, there were 458 people, 164 households, and 132 families residing in the township. The population density was 14.1 inhabitants per square mile (5.4/km^{2}). There were 182 housing units at an average density of 5.6 per square mile (2.2/km^{2}). The racial makeup of the township was 99.13% White, 0.22% from other races, and 0.66% from two or more races. Hispanic or Latino of any race were 2.62% of the population.

There were 164 households, out of which 38.4% had children under the age of 18 living with them, 62.8% were married couples living together, 10.4% had a female householder with no husband present, and 19.5% were non-families. 15.9% of all households were made up of individuals, and 4.3% had someone living alone who was 65 years of age or older. The average household size was 2.79 and the average family size was 3.06.

In the township the population was spread out, with 27.3% under the age of 18, 8.7% from 18 to 24, 28.6% from 25 to 44, 26.9% from 45 to 64, and 8.5% who were 65 years of age or older. The median age was 37 years. For every 100 females, there were 118.1 males. For every 100 females age 18 and over, there were 116.2 males.

The median income for a household in the township was $50,982, and the median income for a family was $54,028. Males had a median income of $31,000 versus $21,458 for females. The per capita income for the township was $20,088. About 4.4% of families and 3.8% of the population were below the poverty line, including none of those under age 18 and 4.9% of those age 65 or over.
