= New London Township, Kandiyohi County, Minnesota =

New London Township, Minnesota
- Township
- Location within Minnesota and the United States New London Township (the United States)
- Coordinates: 45°16′50″N 94°56′58″W
- Country: United States
- State: Minnesota
- County: Kandiyohi

Area
  - Total: 34.7 sq mi (89.9 km^{2})
  - Land: 24.8 sq mi (64.2 km^{2})
  - Water: 9.9 sq mi (25.7 km^{2})
- Elevation: 1,201 ft (366 m)

Population (2000)
  - Total: 3,057
  - Density: 123/sq mi (47.6/km^{2})
- Time zone: UTC-6 (Central (CST))
  - Summer (DST): UTC-5 (CDT)
- ZIP code: 56273
- Area code: 320
- FIPS code: 27-45700
- GNIS feature ID: 0665101
- Website: http://newlondontownship.com/

New London Township is a township in Kandiyohi County, Minnesota, United States. The population was 3,057 at the 2000 census.

New London Township was organized in 1866, and named after New London, Wisconsin.

== Geography ==
According to the United States Census Bureau, the township has a total area of 34.7 square miles (89.9 km^{2}), of which 24.8 square miles (64.2 km^{2}) is land and 9.9 square miles (25.7 km^{2}) (28.60%) is water.

== Demographics ==
As of the census of 2000, there were 3,057 people, 1,173 households, and 896 families residing in the township. The population density was 123.3 inhabitants per square mile (47.6/km^{2}). There were 1,440 housing units at an average density of 58.1 per square mile (22.4/km^{2}). The racial makeup of the township was 98.63% White, 0.10% African American, 0.16% Native American, 0.26% Asian, 0.03% Pacific Islander, 0.46% from other races, and 0.36% from two or more races. Hispanic or Latino of any race were 0.79% of the population.

There were 1,173 households, out of which 35.1% had children under the age of 18 living with them, 67.3% were married couples living together, 5.4% had a female householder with no husband present, and 23.6% were non-families. 19.3% of all households were made up of individuals, and 5.7% had someone living alone who was 65 years of age or older. The average household size was 2.61 and the average family size was 2.98.

In the township the population was spread out, with 26.9% under the age of 18, 6.5% from 18 to 24, 27.9% from 25 to 44, 27.8% from 45 to 64, and 10.8% who were 65 years of age or older. The median age was 39 years. For every 100 females, there were 104.8 males. For every 100 females age 18 and over, there were 104.5 males.

The median income for a household in the township was $51,394, and the median income for a family was $56,424. Males had a median income of $36,705 versus $22,036 for females. The per capita income for the township was $24,336. About 2.7% of families and 4.8% of the population were below the poverty line, including 6.5% of those under age 18 and 6.8% of those age 65 or over.
