= Green Lake (Minnesota) =

Lake in the state of Minnesota, United States

Green Lake in Minnesota could refer to the following:

- Green Lake (Chisago City, Minnesota) in Chisago City, Minnesota
- Green Lake (Isanti County, Minnesota) in Isanti County, Minnesota
- Green Lake (Kandiyohi County, Minnesota) in Kandiyohi County
