= Kandiyohi County Historical Society =

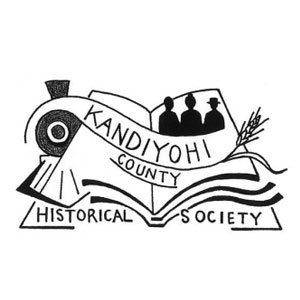

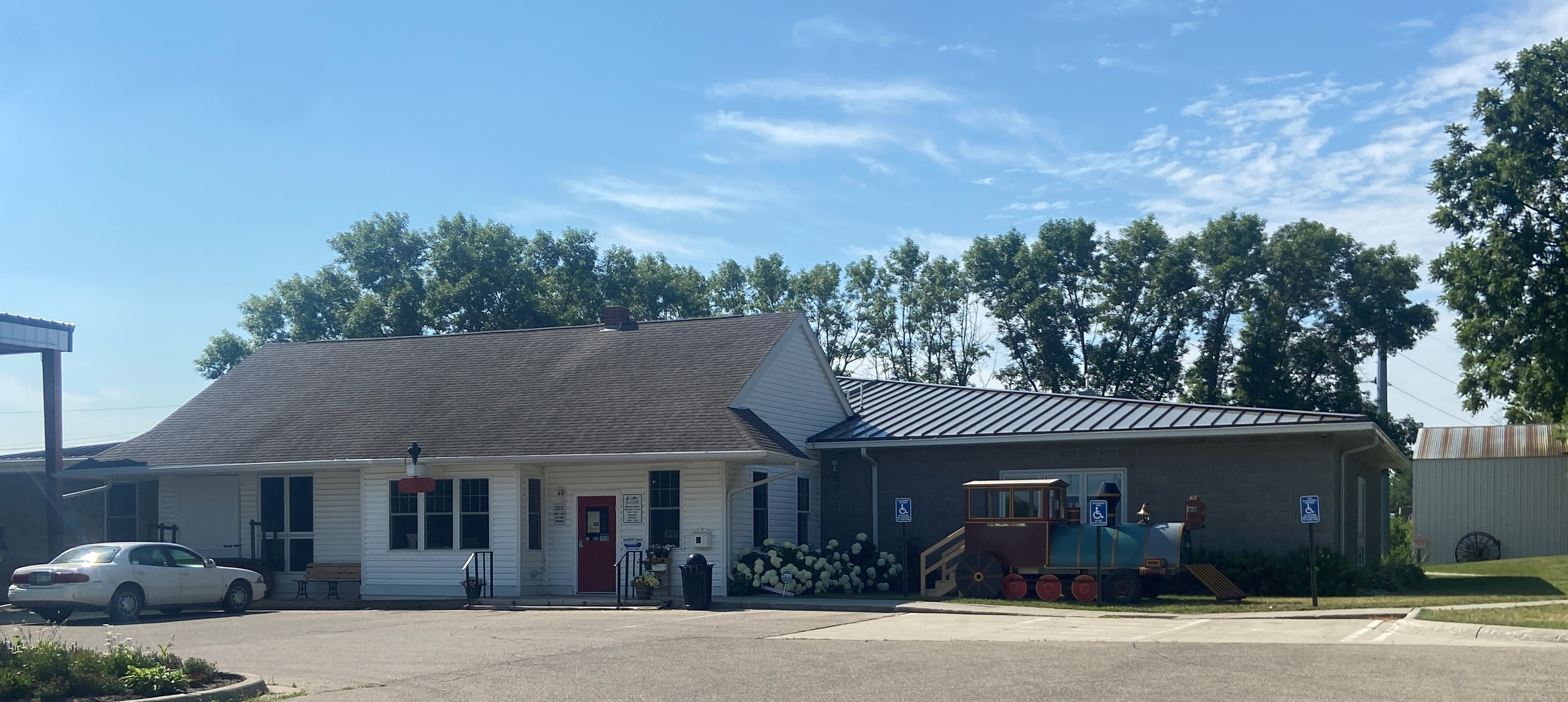
- The Kandiyohi County Museum building.
- Established: 1897
- Location: 610 NE Highway 71; Willmar, MN USA
- Coordinates: 45°7′37″N 95°2′11″W
- Type: History
- Executive director: Jill Wohnoutka
- Website: kandiyohicountyhistory.com

The Kandiyohi County Historical Society (KCHS) is a local history museum in Willmar, Minnesota, United States. Formerly known as the Old Settlers Association, it was founded in 1897 to "discover, preserve and share the story of Kandiyohi County and its people." The archives and Lawson research library are the principal sources used by KCHS staff, volunteers, and visitors to carry out this mission today and into the future. On average, the museum has 9,000 visitors annually.

== Features ==
KCHS consists of six buildings: a main museum and research library; the Sperry House, a restored turn-of-the-century Victorian home; a one-room schoolhouse; an agricultural barn; a restored log cabin which was a site of the 1862 US-Dakota conflict; and Great Northern Passenger Engine #2523.

=== Great Northern class P-2 Mountain (4-8-2) #2523 ===
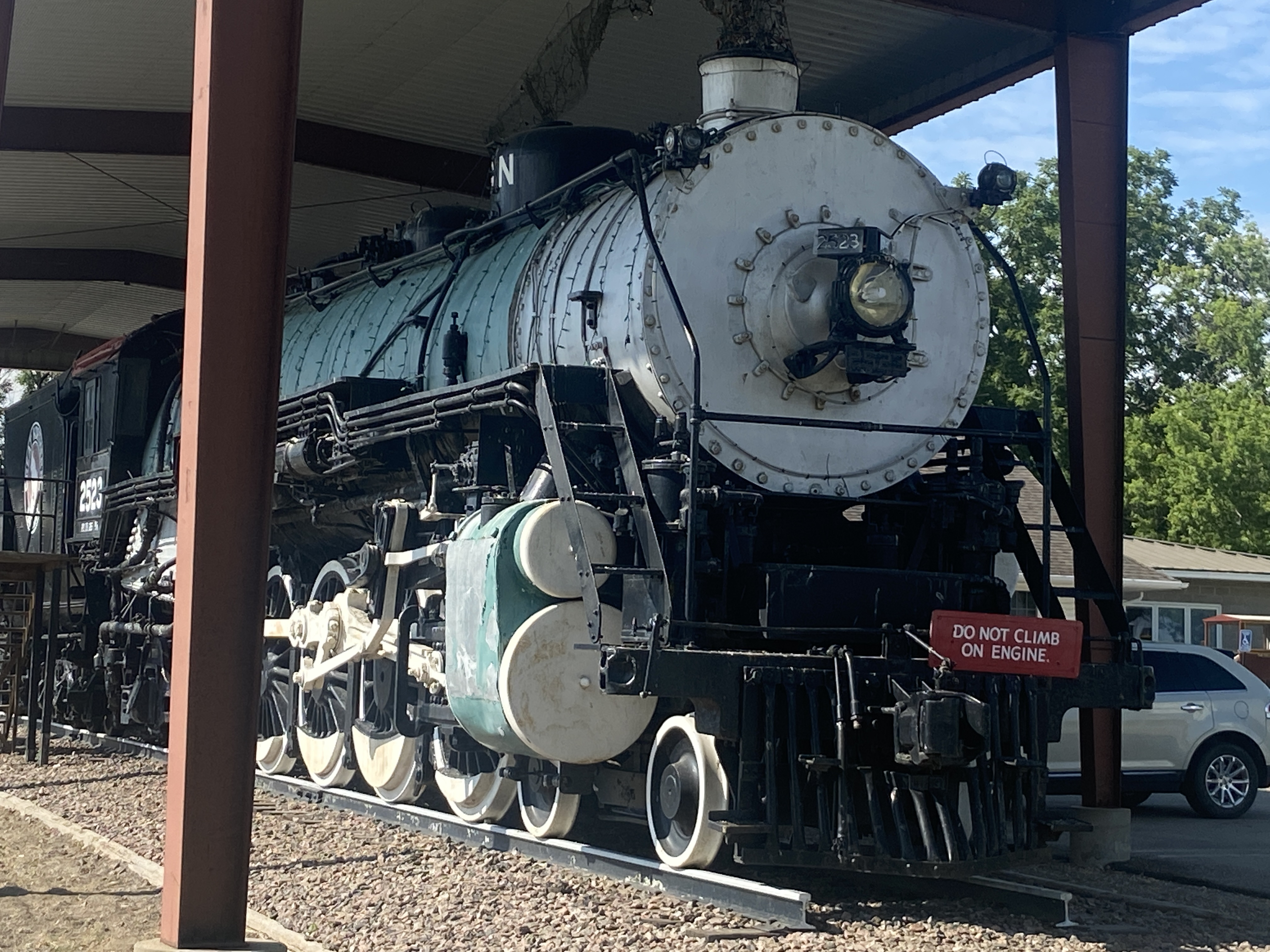
Great Northern P-2

This locomotive, built in 1923, was commissioned to keep up with increased demand for passenger trains along the Great Northern railroad. It had a top speed of 50 mph and could haul up to 12 heavyweight passenger cars at a time. This series was retired in 1955, and this engine in particular was placed on permanent display at KCHS in 1965. Only one other locomotive of its type remains, in Port of Pasco, Washington.

== Exhibits ==
Regular exhibits include several displays marking the involvement of Kandiyohi County residents in conflicts such as the Civil War, the Spanish-American War, World War I and II, and the 1862 US-Dakota conflict. Additionally, the museum features a monthly rotating display of notable items from its collections. Exhibits focus principally on the effects of wider historical events on local residents.

== Programming ==
KCHS offers educational programs for all ages, with a focus on increasing youth engagement. They host events, lectures, and workshops related to local history.

== West Central Area Baseball Hall of Fame ==
KCHS partnered with the Willmar Stingers, a collegiate summer baseball team, to establish the Hall of Fame in 2013. The KCHS spearheads the nomination process, accepting submissions and managing a selection committee to choose inductees who significantly impacted baseball in the West Central Minnesota region, be it as professional or amateur players, coaches, or community figures. The museum houses displays dedicated to the Hall of Fame and its inductees.

== Gallery ==
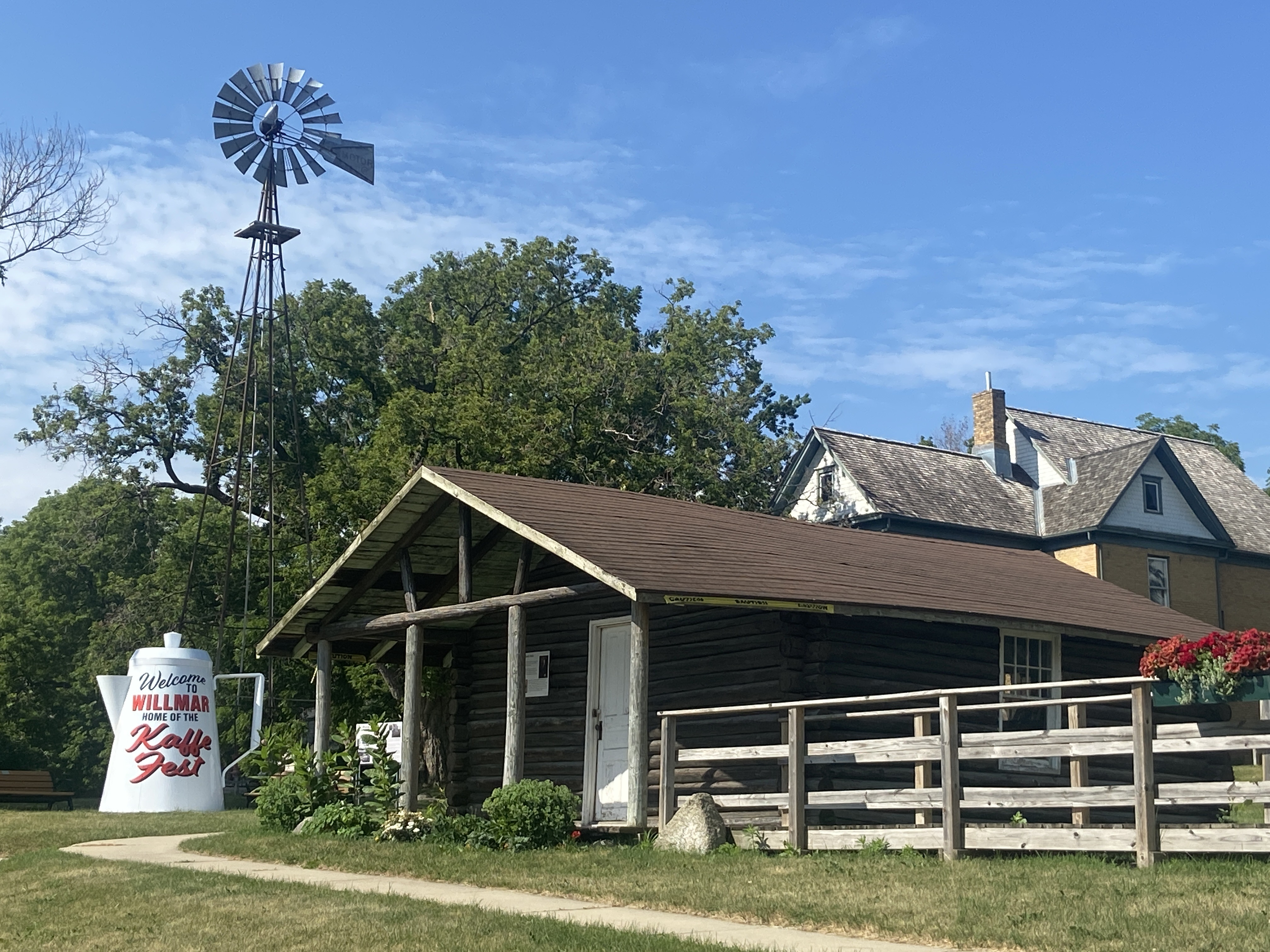
Grandpa's Shed in foreground, Sperry House in background

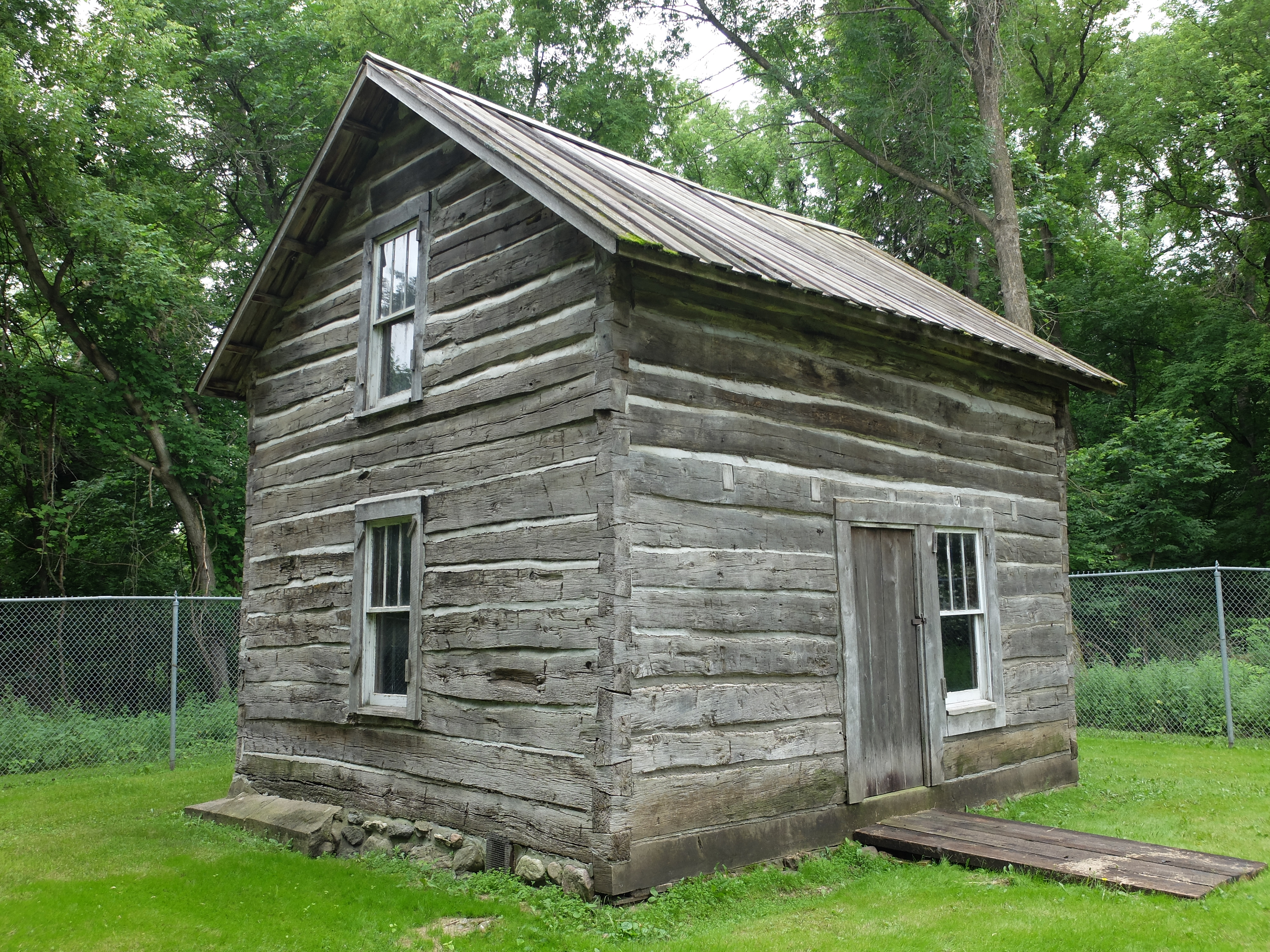
Guri Endreson Cabin

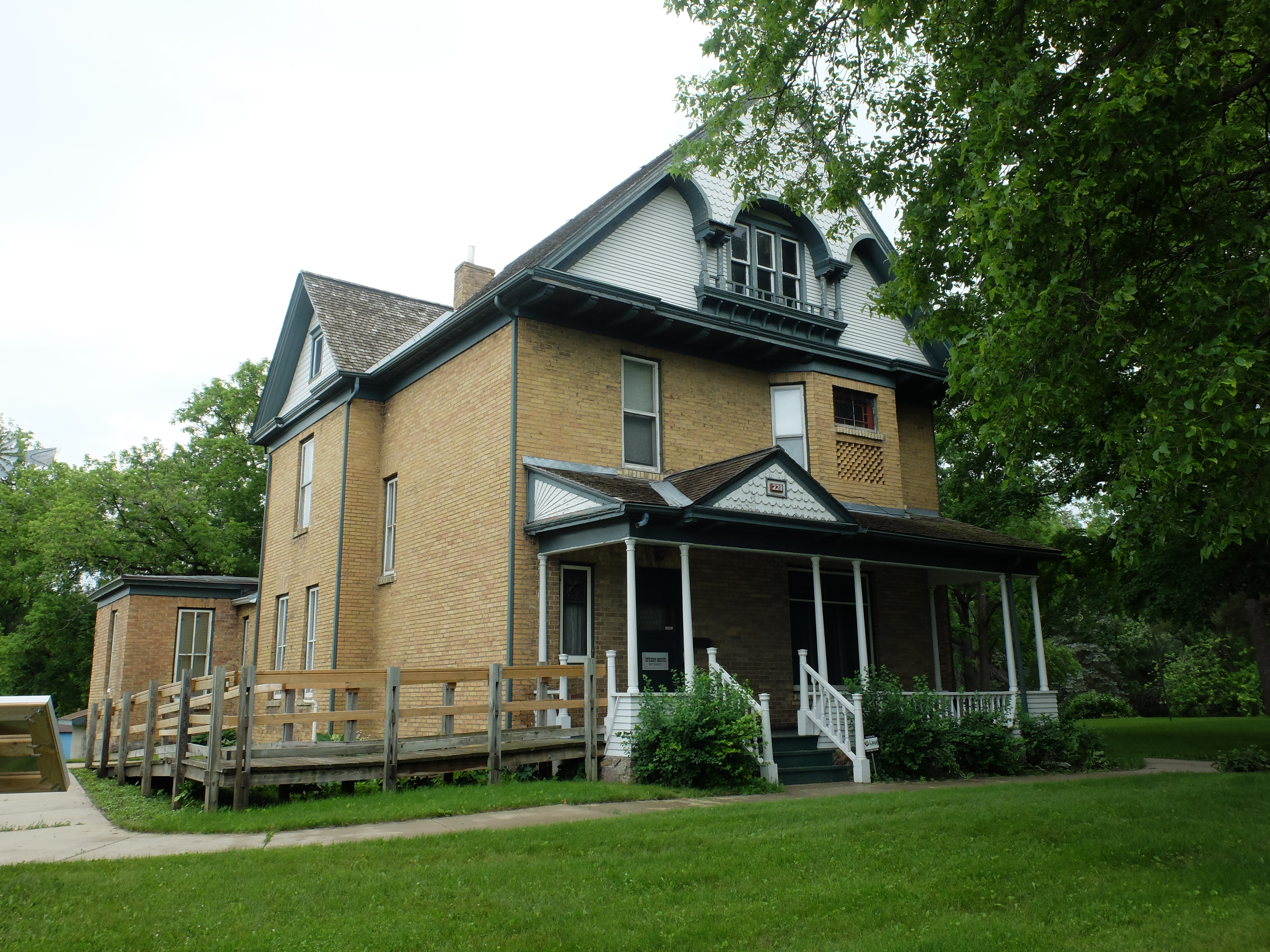
Sperry House

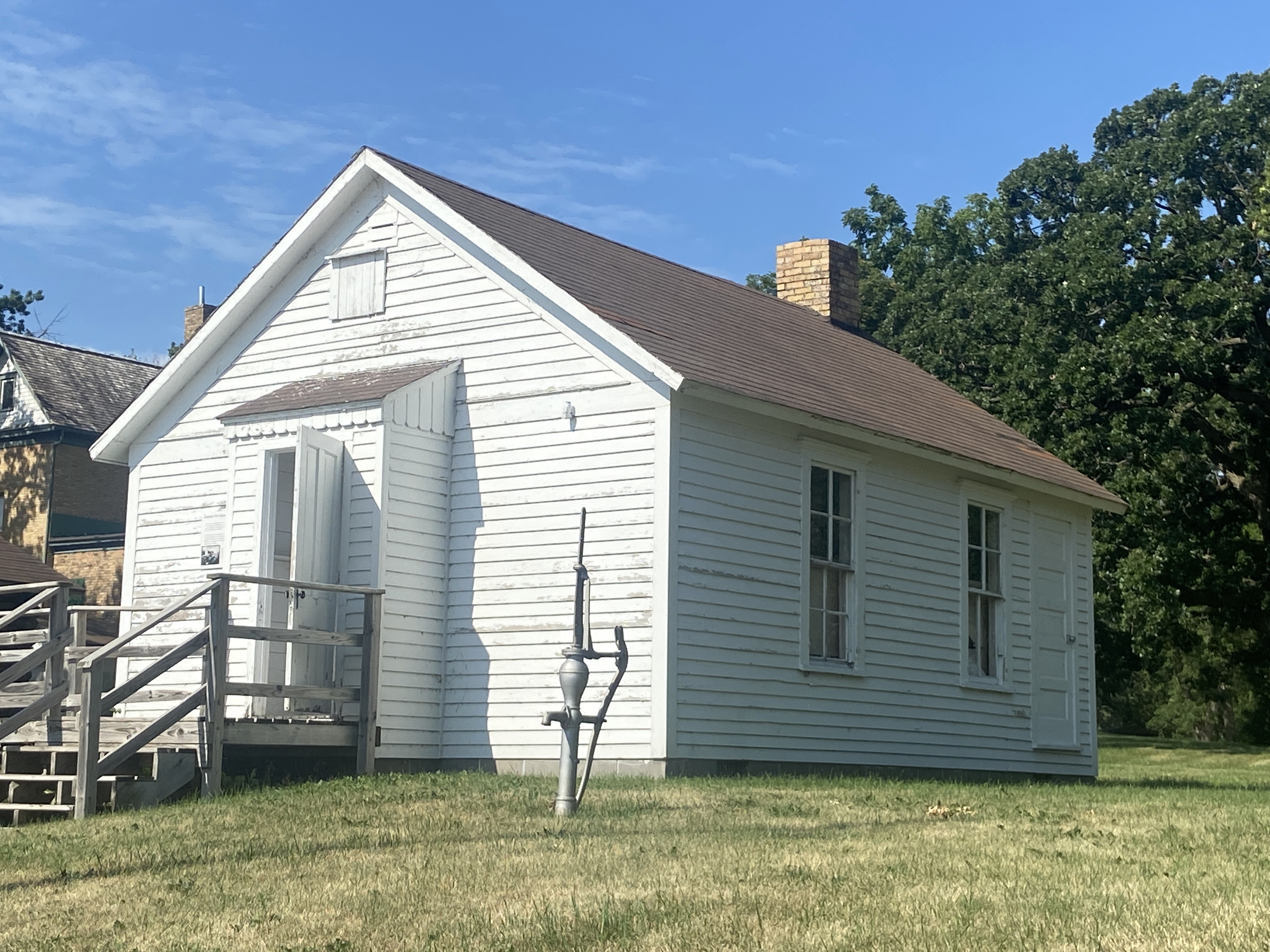
District 18 Schoolhouse
