= Irving Township, Kandiyohi County, Minnesota =

Irving Township, Minnesota
- Township
- Location within Minnesota and the United States Irving Township (the United States)
- Coordinates: 45°16′N 94°50′W
- Country: United States
- State: Minnesota
- County: Kandiyohi

Area
  - Total: 36.1 sq mi (93.6 km^{2})
  - Land: 32.8 sq mi (85.0 km^{2})
  - Water: 3.3 sq mi (8.6 km^{2})
- Elevation: 1,178 ft (359 m)

Population (2000)
  - Total: 787
  - Density: 24/sq mi (9.3/km^{2})
- Time zone: UTC-6 (Central (CST))
  - Summer (DST): UTC-5 (CDT)
- FIPS code: 27-31292
- GNIS feature ID: 0664558

Irving Township is a township in Kandiyohi County, Minnesota, United States. The population was 787 at the 2000 census.

Irving Township was organized in 1868. According to Warren Upham, the township was probably named for Washington Irving, an American author.

== Geography ==
According to the United States Census Bureau, the township has a total area of 36.1 square miles (93 km^{2}), of which 32.8 square miles (85 km^{2}) is land and 3.3 square miles (8.5 km^{2}) (9.19%) is water.

Irving Township is located in Township 121 North of the Arkansas Base Line and Range 33 West of the 5th Principal Meridian.

== Demographics ==
As of the census of 2000, there were 787 people, 310 households, and 243 families residing in the township. The population density was 24.0 inhabitants per square mile (9.3/km^{2}). There were 559 housing units at an average density of 17.0 per square mile (6.6/km^{2}). The racial makeup of the township was 98.60% White, 0.38% African American, 0.51% Asian, 0.13% from other races, and 0.38% from two or more races. Hispanic or Latino of any race were 0.13% of the population.

There were 310 households, out of which 28.7% had children under the age of 18 living with them, 72.6% were married couples living together, 1.9% had a female householder with no husband present, and 21.3% were non-families. 17.7% of all households were made up of individuals, and 5.5% had someone living alone who was 65 years of age or older. The average household size was 2.54 and the average family size was 2.86.

In the township the population was spread out, with 23.5% under the age of 18, 6.2% from 18 to 24, 23.9% from 25 to 44, 27.3% from 45 to 64, and 19.1% who were 65 years of age or older. The median age was 43 years. For every 100 females, there were 112.7 males. For every 100 females age 18 and over, there were 109.0 males.

The median income for a household in the township was $47,188, and the median income for a family was $55,781. Males had a median income of $35,313 versus $23,393 for females. The per capita income for the township was $21,715. About 5.4% of families and 7.7% of the population were below the poverty line, including 13.9% of those under age 18 and 2.1% of those age 65 or over.
