= Harrison Township, Kandiyohi County, Minnesota =

Harrison Township, Minnesota
- Township
- Location within Minnesota and the United States Harrison Township (the United States)
- Coordinates: 45°12′N 94°49′W
- Country: United States
- State: Minnesota
- County: Kandiyohi

Area
  - Total: 35.3 sq mi (91.3 km^{2})
  - Land: 31.7 sq mi (82.2 km^{2})
  - Water: 3.5 sq mi (9.1 km^{2})
- Elevation: 1,171 ft (357 m)

Population (2000)
  - Total: 665
  - Density: 21/sq mi (8.1/km^{2})
- Time zone: UTC-6 (Central (CST))
  - Summer (DST): UTC-5 (CDT)
- FIPS code: 27-27314
- GNIS feature ID: 0664402

Harrison Township is a township in Kandiyohi County, Minnesota, United States. The population was 665 at the 2000 census.

Harrison Township was organized in 1858, and named for Joseph D. Harris, an early settler.

== Geography ==
According to the United States Census Bureau, the township has a total area of 35.3 square miles (91 km^{2}), of which 31.7 square miles (82 km^{2}) is land and 3.5 square miles (9.1 km^{2}) (10.01%) is water.

Harrison Township is located in Township 120 North of the Arkansas Base Line and Range 33 West of the 5th Principal Meridian.

== Demographics ==
As of the census of 2000, there were 665 people, 259 households, and 198 families residing in the township. The population density was 21.0 inhabitants per square mile (8.1/km^{2}). There were 479 housing units at an average density of 15.1 per square mile (5.8/km^{2}). The racial makeup of the township was 99.25% White, 0.15% Native American, and 0.60% from two or more races. Hispanic or Latino of any race were 0.90% of the population.

There were 259 households, out of which 33.2% had children under the age of 18 living with them, 71.4% were married couples living together, 3.5% had a female householder with no husband present, and 23.2% were non-families. 19.3% of all households were made up of individuals, and 8.9% had someone living alone who was 65 years of age or older. The average household size was 2.57 and the average family size was 2.97.

In the township the population was spread out, with 25.0% under the age of 18, 5.3% from 18 to 24, 27.7% from 25 to 44, 27.2% from 45 to 64, and 14.9% who were 65 years of age or older. The median age was 42 years. For every 100 females, there were 107.8 males. For every 100 females age 18 and over, there were 101.2 males.

The median income for a household in the township was $41,429, and the median income for a family was $48,854. Males had a median income of $33,214 versus $25,833 for females. The per capita income for the township was $18,166. About 3.5% of families and 5.0% of the population were below the poverty line, including 4.5% of those under age 18 and 5.9% of those age 65 or over.
