= Roseland, Minnesota =

Unincorporated community in Minnesota, United States

Roseland
- Unincorporated community
- Location within Minnesota Location within the United States
- Coordinates: 44°56′33″N 95°06′20″W
- Country: United States
- State: Minnesota
- County: Kandiyohi
- Township: Roseland
- Elevation: 1,102 ft (336 m)
- Time zone: UTC-6 (Central (CST))
  - Summer (DST): UTC-5 (CDT)
- Area code: 320
- GNIS feature ID: 650287

Roseland is an unincorporated community in Kandiyohi County, Minnesota, United States. It was settled in 1926 by Dutch Immigrants. It grew from its founding until the 1960s because of its railroad. It was once a popular place to play baseball, but the baseball field was replaced by houses.
