= Lake Andrew Township, Kandiyohi County, Minnesota =

Lake Andrew Township, Minnesota
- Township
- Location within Minnesota and the United States Lake Andrew Township (the United States)
- Coordinates: 45°16′39″N 95°4′30″W
- Country: United States
- State: Minnesota
- County: Kandiyohi

Area
  - Total: 35.9 sq mi (93.1 km^{2})
  - Land: 29.3 sq mi (76.0 km^{2})
  - Water: 6.6 sq mi (17.1 km^{2})
- Elevation: 1,158 ft (353 m)

Population (2000)
  - Total: 1,051
  - Density: 36/sq mi (13.8/km^{2})
- Time zone: UTC-6 (Central (CST))
  - Summer (DST): UTC-5 (CDT)
- FIPS code: 27-34064
- GNIS feature ID: 0664661
- Website: https://www.lakeandrewtwp.gov/

Lake Andrew Township is a township in Kandiyohi County, Minnesota, United States. The population was 1,051 at the 2000 census.

Lake Andrew Township was organized in 1872, and named for its Andrew Lake.

== Geography ==
According to the United States Census Bureau, the township has a total area of 35.9 square miles (93 km^{2}), of which 29.4 square miles (76 km^{2}) is land and 6.6 square miles (17 km^{2}) (18.34%) is water.

== Demographics ==
As of the census of 2000, there were 1,051 people, 413 households, and 339 families residing in the township. The population density was 35.8 inhabitants per square mile (13.8/km^{2}). There were 783 housing units at an average density of 26.7 per square mile (10.3/km^{2}). The racial makeup of the township was 99.71% White, 0.10% African American, 0.10% Native American, and 0.10% from two or more races. Hispanic or Latino of any race were 0.86% of the population.

There were 413 households, out of which 28.6% had children under the age of 18 living with them, 76.0% were married couples living together, 3.9% had a female householder with no husband present, and 17.9% were non-families. 16.2% of all households were made up of individuals, and 6.1% had someone living alone who was 65 years of age or older. The average household size was 2.54 and the average family size was 2.84.

In the township the population was spread out, with 21.8% under the age of 18, 6.6% from 18 to 24, 21.7% from 25 to 44, 32.6% from 45 to 64, and 17.3% who were 65 years of age or older. The median age was 45 years. For every 100 females, there were 105.7 males. For every 100 females age 18 and over, there were 102.5 males.

The median income for a household in the township was $54,464, and the median income for a family was $60,625. Males had a median income of $40,188 versus $22,014 for females. The per capita income for the township was $27,344. About 0.3% of families and 2.5% of the population were below the poverty line, including 2.0% of those under age 18 and 5.0% of those age 65 or over.
