= Lake Elizabeth (Kandiyohi County, Minnesota) =

Lake in the state of Minnesota, United States

- Location within Minnesota
- Location: Kandiyohi County, Minnesota
- Coordinates: 45°3′52″N 94°48′6″W
- Type: lake
- Surface area: 1,054 acres (427 ha)
- Max. depth: 9 feet (2.7 m)
- Surface elevation: 1,125 feet (343 m)

Lake Elizabeth is a shallow glacial lake in Kandiyohi County, in the U.S. state of Minnesota.; it was named after the wife of a local land official. Lakes Ella and Carrie nearby were named for their daughters.

The lake is approximately 1,054 acres (427 ha) in size and is around nine feet deep at its deepest point.

== See also ==
- List of lakes in Minnesota
