= Whitefield Township, Kandiyohi County, Minnesota =

Whitefield Township, Minnesota
- Township
- Location within Minnesota and the United States Whitefield Township (the United States)
- Coordinates: 45°1′40″N 95°4′16″W
- Country: United States
- State: Minnesota
- County: Kandiyohi

Area
  - Total: 36.2 sq mi (93.8 km^{2})
  - Land: 35.3 sq mi (91.4 km^{2})
  - Water: 0.93 sq mi (2.4 km^{2})
- Elevation: 1,119 ft (341 m)

Population (2000)
  - Total: 571
  - Density: 16/sq mi (6.2/km^{2})
- Time zone: UTC-6 (Central (CST))
  - Summer (DST): UTC-5 (CDT)
- FIPS code: 27-70078
- GNIS feature ID: 0665987

Whitefield Township is a township in Kandiyohi County, Minnesota, United States. The population was 571 at the 2000 census.

== History ==
Whitefield Township was organized in 1870, and named for Edwin Whitefield, an artist who visited the area with explorers in the 1850s.

== Geography ==
According to the United States Census Bureau, the township has a total area of 36.2 square miles (93.8 km^{2}), of which 35.3 square miles (91.4 km^{2}) is land and 0.9 square mile (2.4 km^{2}) (2.59%) is water.

== Demographics ==
As of the census of 2000, there were 571 people, 194 households, and 156 families residing in the township. The population density was 16.2 people per square mile (6.2/km^{2}). There were 201 housing units at an average density of 5.7/sq mi (2.2/km^{2}). The racial makeup of the township was 98.25% White, 0.18% African American, 0.35% Asian, 0.53% Pacific Islander, 0.35% from other races, and 0.35% from two or more races. Hispanic or Latino of any race were 1.05% of the population.

There were 194 households, out of which 44.3% had children under the age of 18 living with them, 69.6% were married couples living together, 5.7% had a female householder with no husband present, and 19.1% were non-families. 13.4% of all households were made up of individuals, and 5.2% had someone living alone who was 65 years of age or older. The average household size was 2.94 and the average family size was 3.27.

In the township the population was spread out, with 32.9% under the age of 18, 7.2% from 18 to 24, 26.6% from 25 to 44, 22.8% from 45 to 64, and 10.5% who were 65 years of age or older. The median age was 35 years. For every 100 females, there were 111.5 males. For every 100 females age 18 and over, there were 105.9 males.

The median income for a household in the township was $44,375, and the median income for a family was $46,597. Males had a median income of $29,500 versus $21,635 for females. The per capita income for the township was $20,288. About 2.4% of families and 4.3% of the population were below the poverty line, including 4.0% of those under age 18 and 2.9% of those age 65 or over.
