= Endreson Cabin =

Historic house in Minnesota, United States

- Lars and Guri Endreson House
- U.S. National Register of Historic Places
- The building in 2020

- Location within Minnesota Location within the United States
- Location: Off County Highway 5 near Willmar, Minnesota
- Coordinates: 45°11′2″N 95°6′22.5″W
- Built: 1921
- NRHP reference No.: 86001920
- Added to NRHP: July 24, 1986

The Endreson Cabin is a log cabin built about 1858 which has been preserved as a museum near Willmar, Minnesota, United States. It was listed on the National Register of Historic Places in 1986 as the Lars and Guri Endreson House, after the Norwegian-American immigrants who built it. It is one of the oldest buildings on its original site in Kandiyohi County and a rare vestige of its Euro-American settlement prior to the Dakota War of 1862, in which numerous pioneers were killed (including two Endresons) and most of the rest abandoned the area for several years.
