= Roseland Observatory =

Astronomical observatory in Cornwall, England

Coordinates: 50.336°N 4.877°W

Roseland Observatory is located in Court Farm, one mile (1.6 km) southeast of St Stephen-in-Brannel, in mid Cornwall, England, United Kingdom.

Roseland observatory was started in 1998 by Clive Purchase in preparation for the solar eclipse in 1999. It was established at the Roseland Community School in Cornwall and had an array of large telescopes, including a 20" heliostat, the largest in the country, for the study of the Sun. Clive Purchase concentrated on teaching primary schools the basics of astronomy and then bringing the groups to the observatory for night viewing sessions of the night sky.

The observatory carried out an experiments to measure the infrared flux during the eclipse, due to the cloud some unusual results were obtained which are still being researched. The support for this experiment came from the Rutherford Appleton Laboratory. After the eclipse, Brian Sheen relocated the observatory to its present site of Court Farm, St Stephen in Brannel. Brian Sheen is lecturer in Astronomy and Astrophysics at Cornwall College.
