= Lake Andrew (Douglas County, Minnesota) =

Lake in the state of Minnesota, United States

- Location within Minnesota
- Location: Douglas County, Minnesota
- Coordinates: 45°49′15″N 95°25′15″W
- Type: lake
- Surface area: 918 acres (3.72 km^{2})
- Average depth: 29.0 feet (8.8 m)
- Max. depth: 83.0 feet (25.3 m)

Lake Andrew (also called Lake Andrews) is a lake in Douglas County, in the U.S. state of Minnesota. Lake Andrew is a quiet, spring-fed lake located just south of Alexandria. With a size of 918 acres (3.72 km^{2}), it is popular for recreational activities and a good lake for anglers. The most recent Lake Survey reports mean and maximum depths are 29.0 feet (8.8 m) and 83.0 feet (25.3 m), respectively. Water clarity is considered good.

According to Warren Upham, Lake Andrews was probably named for a physician in Alexandria. Alternatively, according to Eugene Roth Family records, Lake Andrew was named for Andrew (Andreas) Roth, a prominent citizen and successful farmer of Douglas County.

== See also ==
- List of lakes in Minnesota
