= Kandiyohi Township, Kandiyohi County, Minnesota =

Kandiyohi Township, Minnesota
- Township
- Location within Minnesota and the United States Kandiyohi Township (the United States)
- Coordinates: 45°6′0″N 94°55′53″W
- Country: United States
- State: Minnesota
- County: Kandiyohi

Area
  - Total: 35.4 sq mi (91.6 km^{2})
  - Land: 33.3 sq mi (86.3 km^{2})
  - Water: 2.0 sq mi (5.3 km^{2})
- Elevation: 1,184 ft (361 m)

Population (2000)
  - Total: 600
  - Density: 18/sq mi (7/km^{2})
- Time zone: UTC-6 (Central (CST))
  - Summer (DST): UTC-5 (CDT)
- ZIP code: 56251
- Area code: 320
- FIPS code: 27-32390
- GNIS feature ID: 0664597

Kandiyohi Township (/ˌkændiˈjoʊhaɪ/ KAN-dee-YOH-hy) is a township in Kandiyohi County, Minnesota, United States. The population was 600 at the 2000 census.

Kandiyohi Township was organized in 1868.

== Geography ==
According to the United States Census Bureau, the township has a total area of 35.4 square miles (92 km^{2}), of which 33.3 square miles (86 km^{2}) is land and 2.0 square miles (5.2 km^{2}) (5.77%) is water.

== Demographics ==
As of the census of 2000, there were 600 people, 225 households, and 182 families residing in the township. The population density was 18.0 inhabitants per square mile (6.9/km^{2}). There were 232 housing units at an average density of 7.0 per square mile (2.7/km^{2}). The racial makeup of the township was 97.17% White, 0.67% African American, 1.00% Asian, 0.83% from other races, and 0.33% from two or more races. Hispanic or Latino of any race were 1.50% of the population.

There were 225 households, out of which 31.6% had children under the age of 18 living with them, 75.6% were married couples living together, 3.1% had a female householder with no husband present, and 18.7% were non-families. 16.0% of all households were made up of individuals, and 7.1% had someone living alone who was 65 years of age or older. The average household size was 2.66 and the average family size was 2.98.

In the township the population was spread out, with 25.7% under the age of 18, 6.3% from 18 to 24, 21.7% from 25 to 44, 33.2% from 45 to 64, and 13.2% who were 65 years of age or older. The median age was 43 years. For every 100 females, there were 111.3 males. For every 100 females age 18 and over, there were 110.4 males.

The median income for a household in the township was $50,781, and the median income for a family was $51,250. Males had a median income of $32,250 versus $21,346 for females. The per capita income for the township was $22,399. About 2.7% of families and 5.2% of the population were below the poverty line, including 8.7% of those under age 18 and 2.4% of those age 65 or over.
