= Andrew Lake (Kandiyohi County, Minnesota) =

Lake in the state of Minnesota, United States

- Location within Minnesota Location within the United States
- Location: Kandiyohi County, Minnesota
- Coordinates: 45°18′36″N 95°2′38″W
- Type: Lake
- Surface elevation: 1,191 feet (363 m)

Andrew Lake is a lake in Kandiyohi County, Minnesota, United States.

Andrew Lake was named for Andrew Holes, a pioneer settler who carved his name on a tree near the lake shore.

== See also ==
- List of lakes in Minnesota
