= New London, Minnesota =

City in Minnesota, United States

New London
- City
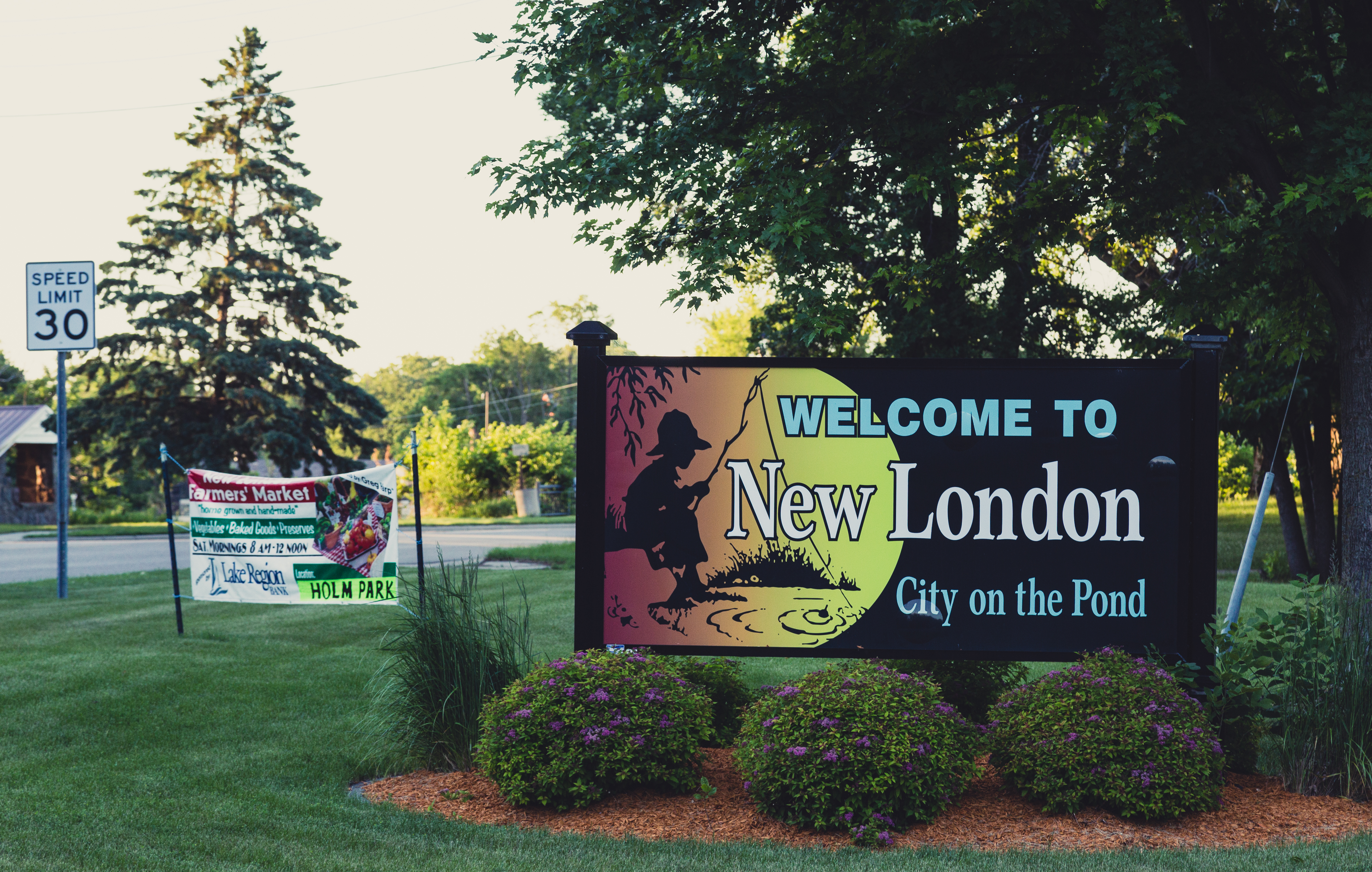

- Location of New London, Minnesota
- Coordinates: 45°17′50″N 94°56′53″W
- Country: United States
- State: Minnesota
- County: Kandiyohi
- Founded: 1865
- Incorporated: April 8, 1889

Government
  - Mayor: John Dahl

Area
  - Total: 1.36 sq mi (3.51 km^{2})
  - Land: 1.29 sq mi (3.35 km^{2})
  - Water: 0.062 sq mi (0.16 km^{2})
- Elevation: 1,253 ft (382 m)

Population (2020)
  - Total: 1,252
  - Estimate (2022): 1,282
  - Density: 968.2/sq mi (373.84/km^{2})
- Time zone: UTC-6 (Central (CST))
  - Summer (DST): UTC-5 (CDT)
- ZIP code: 56273
- Area code: 320
- FIPS code: 27-45682
- GNIS feature ID: 2395203
- Website: newlondonmn.net

New London is a city in Kandiyohi County, Minnesota, United States along the Middle Fork of the Crow River. The population was 1,252 at the 2020 census. Sibley State Park is nearby. It was named after New London, Wisconsin, by Louis Larson because of the similarity he saw with his previous home there. It was incorporated on April 8, 1889. The city was the county seat of Monongalia County from 1866 to 1870 when Monongalia merged with Kandiyohi County.

== Geography ==
According to the United States Census Bureau, the city has an area of 1.24 square miles (3.21 km^{2}), of which 1.19 square miles (3.08 km^{2}) is land and 0.05 square miles (0.13 km^{2}) is water.

Minnesota State Highways 9 and 23 are two of the main routes in the city, and U.S. Route 71 is nearby.

=== Climate ===
Climate data for New London, Minnesota, 1991–2020 normals, extremes 1893–2009
Month	Jan	Feb	Mar	Apr	May	Jun	Jul	Aug	Sep	Oct	Nov	Dec	Year
Record high °F (°C)	60 (16)	58 (14)	83 (28)	95 (35)	107 (42)	108 (42)	110 (43)	102 (39)	106 (41)	90 (32)	78 (26)	62 (17)	110 (43)
Mean daily maximum °F (°C)	20.3 (−6.5)	25.2 (−3.8)	38.0 (3.3)	54.1 (12.3)	68.3 (20.2)	77.5 (25.3)	81.6 (27.6)	79.7 (26.5)	72.1 (22.3)	56.5 (13.6)	39.4 (4.1)	25.0 (−3.9)	53.1 (11.8)
Daily mean °F (°C)	10.9 (−11.7)	14.9 (−9.5)	27.7 (−2.4)	42.7 (5.9)	56.9 (13.8)	67.1 (19.5)	71.5 (21.9)	69.5 (20.8)	61.0 (16.1)	45.9 (7.7)	30.9 (−0.6)	16.8 (−8.4)	43.0 (6.1)
Mean daily minimum °F (°C)	1.4 (−17.0)	4.7 (−15.2)	17.4 (−8.1)	31.3 (−0.4)	45.5 (7.5)	56.7 (13.7)	61.3 (16.3)	59.3 (15.2)	49.9 (9.9)	35.3 (1.8)	22.4 (−5.3)	8.5 (−13.1)	32.8 (0.4)
Record low °F (°C)	−42 (−41)	−40 (−40)	−34 (−37)	−2 (−19)	16 (−9)	28 (−2)	41 (5)	35 (2)	21 (−6)	6 (−14)	−23 (−31)	−35 (−37)	−42 (−41)
Average precipitation inches (mm)	0.87 (22)	0.97 (25)	1.84 (47)	3.05 (77)	3.53 (90)	4.89 (124)	4.15 (105)	3.53 (90)	3.47 (88)	2.60 (66)	1.58 (40)	0.90 (23)	31.38 (797)
Average snowfall inches (cm)	10.3 (26)	9.1 (23)	8.4 (21)	4.7 (12)	0.0 (0.0)	0.0 (0.0)	0.0 (0.0)	0.0 (0.0)	0.0 (0.0)	0.8 (2.0)	9.0 (23)	7.9 (20)	50.2 (127)
Average precipitation days (≥ 0.01 in)	5.3	4.6	6.2	7.2	9.7	10.7	8.9	8.1	8.6	7.1	4.9	5.0	86.3
Average snowy days (≥ 0.1 in)	5.7	4.0	3.6	1.3	0.0	0.0	0.0	0.0	0.0	0.6	2.9	4.8	22.9
Source 1: NOAA
Source 2: XMACIS2

== Demographics ==
Historical population
Census	Pop.	Note	%±
1880	55		—
1890	211		283.6%
1900	363		72.0%
1910	418		15.2%
1920	527		26.1%
1930	483		−8.3%
1940	578		19.7%
1950	726		25.6%
1960	721		−0.7%
1970	736		2.1%
1980	812		10.3%
1990	971		19.6%
2000	1,066		9.8%
2010	1,251		17.4%
2020	1,252		0.1%
2022 (est.)	1,282		2.4%
U.S. Decennial Census; 2020 Census

=== 2010 census ===
As of the census of 2010, there were 1,251 people, 521 households, and 318 families living in the city. The population density was 1,051.3 inhabitants per square mile (405.9/km^{2}). There were 566 housing units at an average density of 475.6 per square mile (183.6/km^{2}). The racial makeup of the city was 98.7% White, 0.2% Native American, 0.1% Asian, 0.9% from other races, and 0.2% from two or more races. Hispanic or Latino of any race were 2.7% of the population.

There were 521 households, of which 31.7% had children under the age of 18 living with them, 47.0% were married couples living together, 11.7% had a female householder with no husband present, 2.3% had a male householder with no wife present, and 39.0% were non-families. 34.7% of all households were made up of individuals, and 21.7% had someone living alone who was 65 years of age or older. The average household size was 2.28 and the average family size was 2.97.

The median age in the city was 40.5 years. 25.5% of residents were under the age of 18; 6.8% were between the ages of 18 and 24; 23.4% were from 25 to 44; 19.6% were from 45 to 64; and 24.6% were 65 years of age or older. The gender makeup of the city was 45.9% male and 54.1% female.

=== 2000 census ===
As of the census of 2000, there were 1,066 people, 415 households, and 261 families living in the city. The population density was 1,103.4 inhabitants per square mile (426.0/km^{2}). There were 439 housing units at an average density of 454.4 per square mile (175.4/km^{2}). The racial makeup of the city was 97.75% White, 0.47% Native American, 0.09% Asian, 0.66% from other races, and 1.03% from two or more races. Hispanic or Latino of any race were 1.50% of the population.

There were 415 households, out of which 32.3% had children under the age of 18 living with them, 49.4% were married couples living together, 11.3% had a female householder with no husband present, and 37.1% were non-families. 33.7% of all households were made up of individuals, and 17.1% had someone living alone who was 65 years of age or older. The average household size was 2.31 and the average family size was 2.95.

In the city, the population was spread out, with 24.3% under the age of 18, 6.4% from 18 to 24, 25.1% from 25 to 44, 17.1% from 45 to 64, and 27.1% who were 65 years of age or older. The median age was 40 years. For every 100 females, there were 76.2 males. For every 100 females age 18 and over, there were 71.7 males.

The median income for a household in the city was $34,018, and the median income for a family was $42,500. Males had a median income of $28,636 versus $21,786 for females. The per capita income for the city was $16,216. About 6.1% of families and 6.8% of the population were below the poverty line, including 4.7% of those under age 18 and 11.6% of those age 65 or over.

== Car races ==
This city is known as the starting point for the New London to New Brighton Antique Car Run, a 120-mile endurance tour for vehicles from 1908 and earlier, or any 1 or 2 cylinder vehicles up to 1915. This event has been held in early to mid-August since 1987. The run goes to New Brighton, Minnesota, and is a reference to the London to Brighton Veteran Car Run from London to Brighton in the United Kingdom.

== Porch Fest ==
New London has hosted an annual one day event called Porch Fest in honor of its late Mayor Bill Gossman a musician and Potter who envisioned the idea of a music festival where groups of musicians played on front porches around New London but passed away before seeing his vision become reality. Porch Fest is usually held the first Saturday in June.
