= Green Lake (Kandiyohi County, Minnesota) =

Lake in the state of Minnesota, United States

- Location within Minnesota
- Location: Kandiyohi County, Minnesota
- Coordinates: 45°14′50″N 94°54′30″W
- Basin countries: United States
- Surface area: 5,560 acres (22.5 km^{2})
- Average depth: 21 ft (6.4 m)
- Max. depth: 110 ft (34 m)
- Shore length^{1}: 12.01 miles (19.33 km)
- Surface elevation: 1,158 ft (353 m)
- Settlements: Spicer, Minnesota
- ^{1} Shore length is not a well-defined measure.

Green Lake is a lake in Kandiyohi County, Minnesota. The lake has a surface area of 5,560.65 acres (22.5032 km^{2}).

Green Lake was named in the 1850s for its greenish color of its water.
