= Kandiyohi County, Minnesota =

County in Minnesota, United States

- County
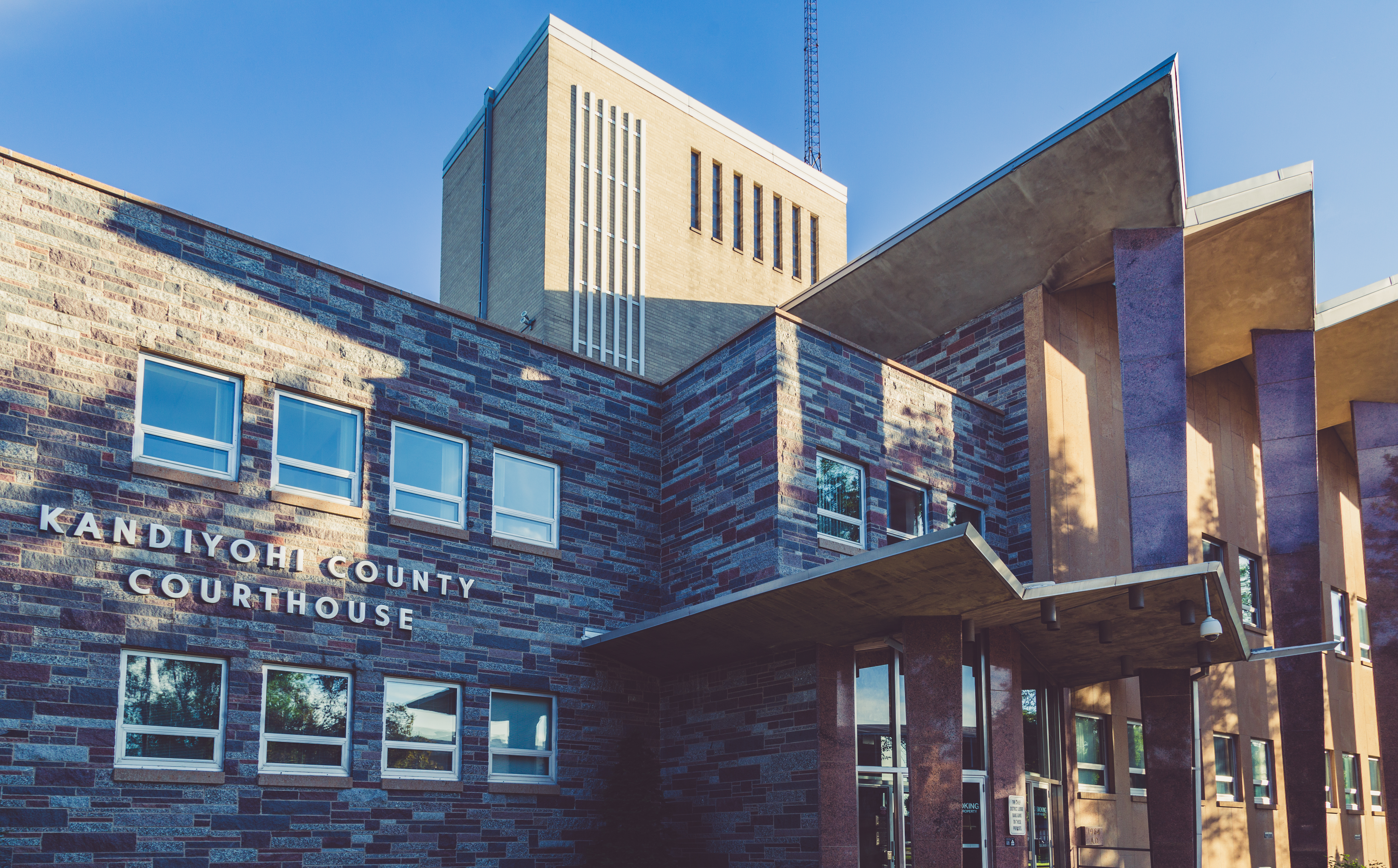
- Kandiyohi County Courthouse

- Location within the U.S. state of Minnesota
- Coordinates: 45°09′N 95°01′W
- Country: United States
- State: Minnesota
- Founded: March 20, 1858
- Named for: "where buffalo fish come" (Dakota)
- Seat: Willmar
- Largest city: Willmar

Area
  - Total: 862 sq mi (2,230 km^{2})
  - Land: 797 sq mi (2,060 km^{2})
  - Water: 66 sq mi (170 km^{2}) 7.6%

Population (2020)
  - Total: 43,732
  - Estimate (2025): 44,720 ▲
  - Density: 54.9/sq mi (21.2/km^{2})
- Time zone: UTC−6 (Central)
  - Summer (DST): UTC−5 (CDT)
- Congressional district: 7th
- Website: www.kcmn.us

Kandiyohi County (/ˌkændiˈjoʊhaɪ/ KAN-dee-YOH-hy) is a county in the U.S. state of Minnesota. As of the 2020 census, its population is 43,732. As of November 20, 1871, its county seat is Willmar.

Kandiyohi County comprises the US Census Bureau's "Willmar, MN Micropolitan Statistical Area".

== History ==
Kandiyohi County is named for a Dakota word meaning "where the buffalo fish come". (kandi’ - the buffalo fish + oh-hi’-yu - v. of hiyu - to come through). It was organized on March 20, 1858, with Kandiyohi established as the county seat in 1870 (it was then called Kandiyohi Station, as it was merely a stop on the railroad line). The original county occupied only the southern half of its current area. Development was slow, and in 1870 the state legislature called for Monongalia County to merge with Kandiyohi. It took until November 21, 1871, to agree on the centrally located Willmar as the county seat.

In March 1915, a law was signed to give Minnesota counties the right to choose whether to allow alcohol production. At this point, all cities in Kandiyohi County had already voted to ban alcohol. Until May 1965, when county option was eliminated, Kandiyohi was a dry county; no beverages with over 3.2% alcohol could be sold.

== Geography ==
The terrain of Kandiyohi County consists of rolling hills, partly wooded, mostly devoted to agriculture. The territory slopes to the south and west, with the highest point near its northeastern corner, at 1,306 ft (398 m) ASL. The county has a total area of 862 square miles (2,230 km^{2}), of which 797 square miles (2,060 km^{2}) are land and 66 square miles (170 km^{2}) (7.6%) are covered by water. Kandiyohi County is one of seven southern Minnesota counties that have no forest soils; only prairie ecosystems of savannas and prairies exist.

Soils of Kandiyohi County

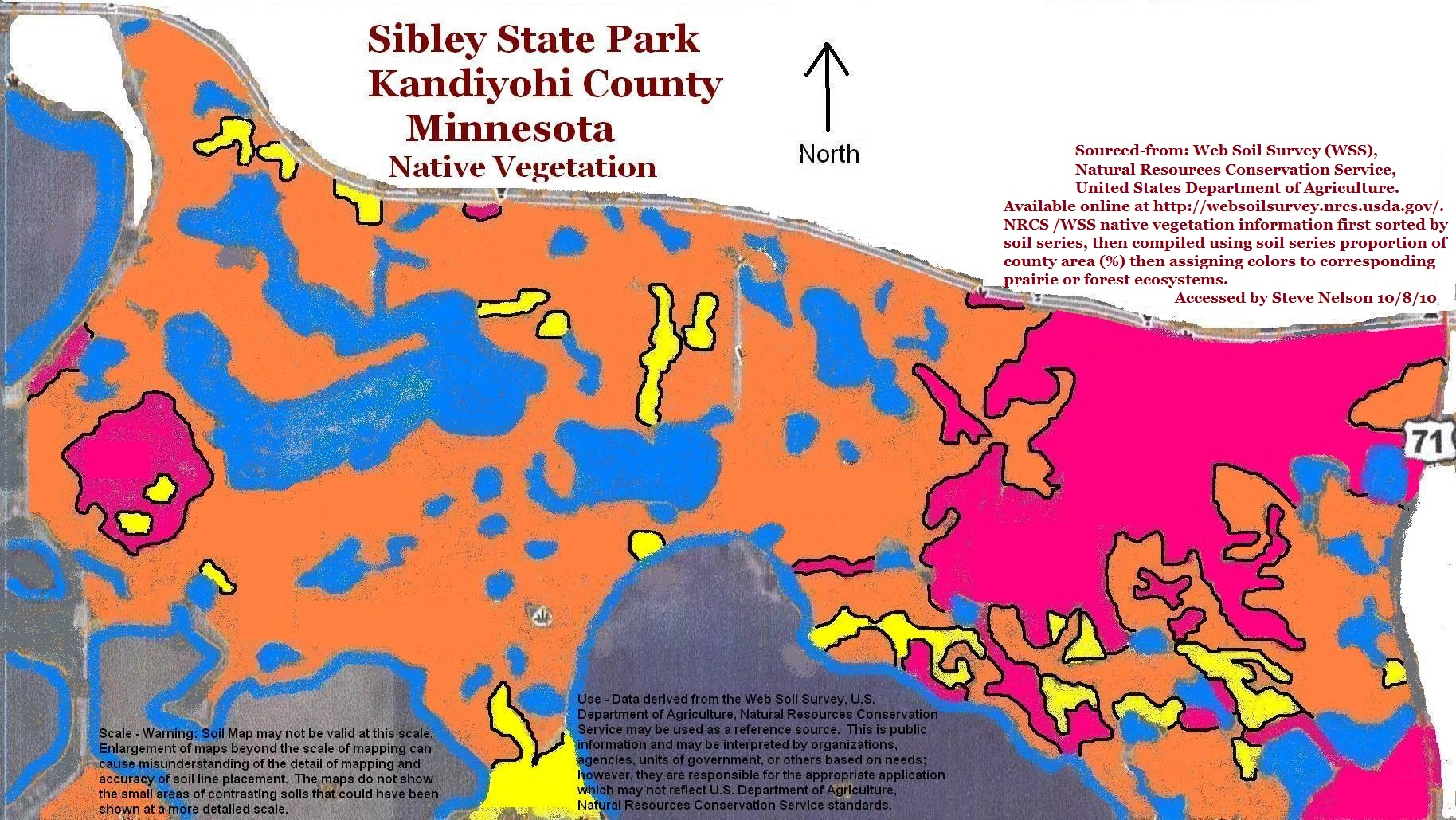
Soils of Sibley State Park

=== Lakes ===
There are nearly 70 named lakes in the county. Among these include:

- Big Kandiyohi Lake
- Green Lake
- Little Kandiyohi Lake
- Long Lake (Dovre Township)
- Long Lake: (Irving and Roseville townships)
- Nest Lake
- Swan Lake (Colfax and Lake Andrew townships)
- Swan Lake: (Dovre and Willmar townships)
- Swan Lake: (Kandiyohi Township)
- Swan Lake: (Mamre Township)
- Woodcock Lake (Green Lake Township)
- Woodcock Lake: (New London and Green Lake townships)

=== Major highways ===
- U.S. Highway 12
- U.S. Highway 71
- US 71 Bus.
- Minnesota State Highway 4
- Minnesota State Highway 7
- Minnesota State Highway 9
- Minnesota State Highway 23
- Bus. MN 23
- Minnesota State Highway 40
- Minnesota State Highway 55
- Minnesota State Highway 104

=== Adjacent counties ===
- Stearns County (north)
- Meeker County (east)
- Renville County (south)
- Chippewa County (southwest)
- Swift County (west)
- Pope County (northwest)

=== Protected areas ===
- Burbank State Wildlife Management Area
- Dietrich Lange State Wildlife Management Area
- Oleander State Wildlife Management Area
- Ringo-Nest State Wildlife Management Area
- Roseville State Wildlife Management Area
- Sibley State Park
- Sunburg State Wildlife Management Area
- Yohi State Wildlife Management Area

== Demographics ==
Historical population
Census	Pop.	Note	%±
1860	76		—
1870	1,760		2,215.8%
1880	10,159		477.2%
1890	13,997		37.8%
1900	18,416		31.6%
1910	18,969		3.0%
1920	22,060		16.3%
1930	23,574		6.9%
1940	26,524		12.5%
1950	28,644		8.0%
1960	29,987		4.7%
1970	30,548		1.9%
1980	36,763		20.3%
1990	38,761		5.4%
2000	41,203		6.3%
2010	42,239		2.5%
2020	43,732		3.5%
2025 (est.)	44,720	▲	2.3%
U.S. Decennial Census; 1790-1960 1900-1990; 1990-2000 2010-2020

=== 2020 census ===
As of the 2020 census, the county had a population of 43,732. The median age was 39.3 years. 24.9% of residents were under the age of 18 and 19.4% of residents were 65 years of age or older. For every 100 females there were 99.4 males, and for every 100 females age 18 and over there were 97.7 males age 18 and over.

The racial makeup of the county was 80.0% White, 6.1% Black or African American, 0.5% American Indian and Alaska Native, 1.3% Asian, 0.1% Native Hawaiian and Pacific Islander, 5.1% from some other race, and 6.9% from two or more races. Hispanic or Latino residents of any race comprised 13.5% of the population.

57.0% of residents lived in urban areas, while 43.0% lived in rural areas.

There were 17,079 households in the county, of which 29.7% had children under the age of 18 living in them. Of all households, 51.8% were married-couple households, 17.9% were households with a male householder and no spouse or partner present, and 23.7% were households with a female householder and no spouse or partner present. About 27.8% of all households were made up of individuals and 12.2% had someone living alone who was 65 years of age or older.

There were 19,950 housing units, of which 14.4% were vacant. Among occupied housing units, 72.3% were owner-occupied and 27.7% were renter-occupied. The homeowner vacancy rate was 1.3% and the rental vacancy rate was 9.9%.

=== Racial and ethnic composition ===
Kandiyohi County, Minnesota – Racial and ethnic composition Note: the US Census treats Hispanic/Latino as an ethnic category. This table excludes Latinos from the racial categories and assigns them to a separate category. Hispanics/Latinos may be of any race.
Race / Ethnicity (NH = Non-Hispanic)	Pop 1980	Pop 1990	Pop 2000	Pop 2010	Pop 2020	% 1980	% 1990	% 2000	% 2010	% 2020
White alone (NH)	36,286	37,057	37,212	35,964	33,303	98.70%	95.60%	90.31%	85.14%	76.15%
Black or African American alone (NH)	25	75	173	952	2,618	0.07%	0.19%	0.42%	2.25%	5.99%
Native American or Alaska Native alone (NH)	61	152	115	107	115	0.17%	0.39%	0.28%	0.25%	0.26%
Asian alone (NH)	139	110	152	167	586	0.38%	0.28%	0.37%	0.40%	1.34%
Native Hawaiian or Pacific Islander alone (NH)	x	x	25	16	37	x	x	0.06%	0.04%	0.08%
Other race alone (NH)	46	4	13	27	98	0.13%	0.01%	0.03%	0.06%	0.22%
Mixed race or Multiracial (NH)	x	x	218	296	1,059	x	x	0.53%	0.70%	2.42%
Hispanic or Latino (any race)	206	1,363	3,295	4,710	5,916	0.56%	3.52%	8.00%	11.15%	13.53%
Total	36,763	38,761	41,203	42,239	43,732	100.00%	100.00%	100.00%	100.00%	100.00%

=== 2010 census ===
As of the 2010 census, there were 42,239 people residing in the county.

=== 2000 census ===
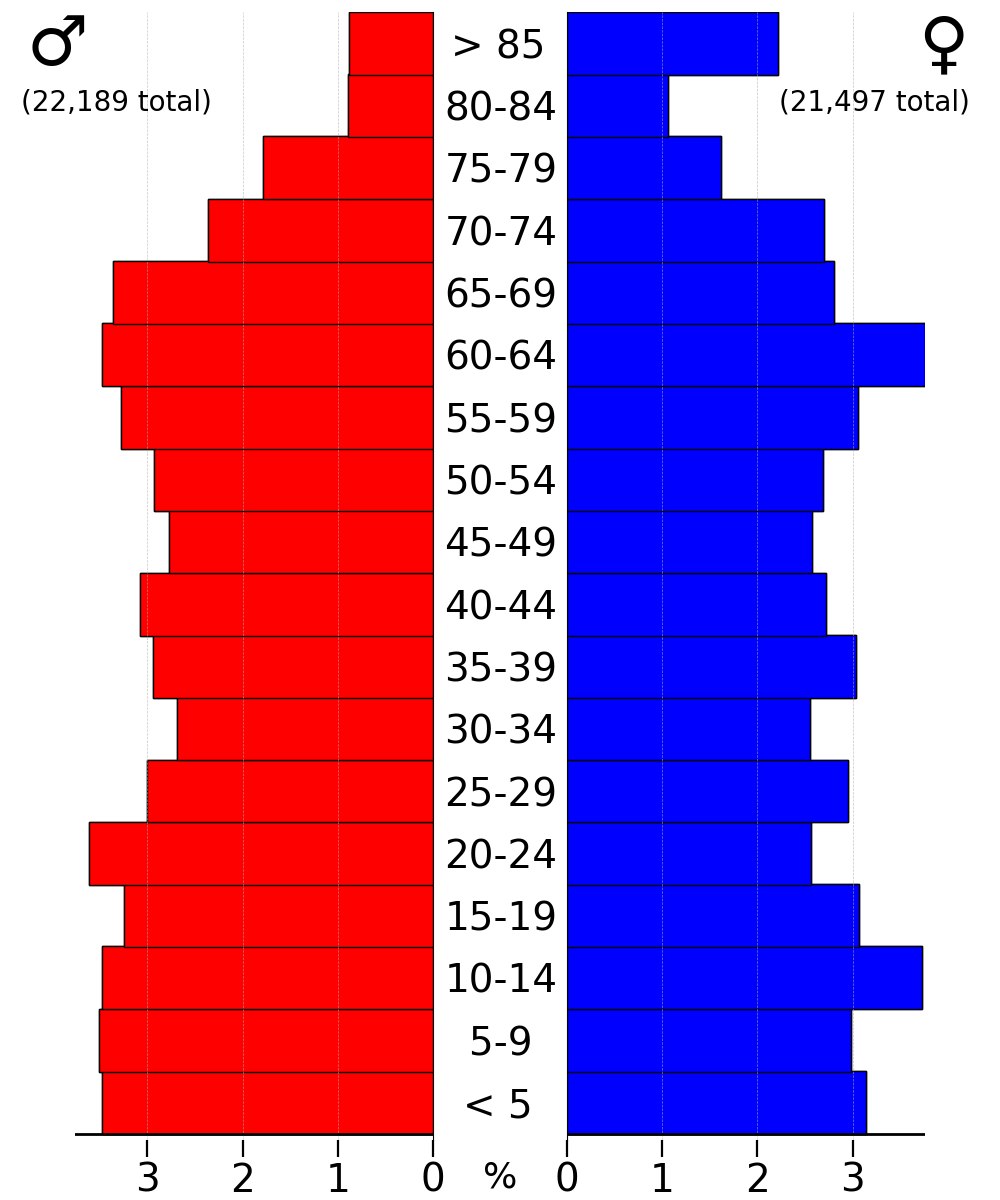
2022 US Census population pyramid for Kandiyohi County, from ACS 5-year estimates

As of the census of 2000, there were 41,203 people, 15,936 households, and 10,979 families residing in the county. The population density was 51.7 per square mile (20.0/km^{2}). There were 18,415 housing units at an average density of 23.1 per square mile (8.9/km^{2}). The racial makeup of the county was 93.62% White, 0.51% Black or African American, 0.33% Native American, 0.38% Asian, 0.07% Pacific Islander, 4.17% from other races, and 0.91% from two or more races. 8.00% of the population were Hispanic or Latino of any race. 31.4% were of German, 25.8% Norwegian, 9.9% Swedish and 5.6% Dutch ancestry.

There were 15,936 households, out of which 33.10% had children under the age of 18 living with them, 57.70% were married couples living together, 7.50% had a female householder with no husband present, and 31.10% were non-families. 25.70% of all households were made up of individuals, and 10.80% had someone living alone who was 65 years of age or older. The average household size was 2.53 and the average family size was 3.05.

The county population contained 26.60% under the age of 18, 9.50% from 18 to 24, 26.50% from 25 to 44, 22.50% from 45 to 64, and 14.90% who were 65 years of age or older. The median age was 37 years. For every 100 females there were 98.00 males. For every 100 females age 18 and over, there were 94.90 males.

The median income for a household in the county was $39,772, and the median income for a family was $48,016. Males had a median income of $32,272 versus $22,128 for females. The per capita income for the county was $19,627. About 5.90% of families and 9.20% of the population were below the poverty line, including 11.10% of those under age 18 and 7.90% of those age 65 or over.

== Communities ==
=== Cities ===
- Atwater
- Blomkest
- Kandiyohi
- Lake Lillian
- New London
- Pennock
- Prinsburg
- Raymond
- Regal
- Spicer
- Sunburg
- Willmar (county seat)

=== Unincorporated communities ===
- Hawick
- Norway Lake
- Priam
- Roseland
- Svea

=== Townships ===
- Arctander Township
- Burbank Township
- Colfax Township
- Dovre Township
- East Lake Lillian Township
- Edwards Township
- Fahlun Township
- Gennessee Township
- Green Lake Township
- Harrison Township
- Holland Township
- Irving Township
- Kandiyohi Township
- Lake Andrew Township
- Lake Elizabeth Township
- Lake Lillian Township
- Mamre Township
- New London Township
- Norway Lake Township
- Roseland Township
- Roseville Township
- St. Johns Township
- Whitefield Township
- Willmar Township

== Politics ==
Kandiyohi County voters have switched from Democratic to Republican in recent years. In no national election since 1996 has the county selected the Democratic Party candidate (as of 2024). However, Democratic incumbent Amy Klobuchar won the county in 2018 as she coasted to an easy reelection over Republican challenger Jim Newberger. Klobuchar also carried Kandiyohi County in her 2006 and 2012 victories but lost it by 14% in her successful 2024 reelection bid.

United States presidential election results for Kandiyohi County, Minnesota
Year	Republican		Democratic		Third party(ies)	
Year	No.	%	No.	%	No.	%
1892	1,341	50.93%	391	14.85%	901	34.22%
1896	2,181	56.25%	1,638	42.25%	58	1.50%
1900	2,343	64.32%	1,204	33.05%	96	2.64%
1904	2,576	81.26%	252	7.95%	342	10.79%
1908	2,312	63.62%	947	26.06%	375	10.32%
1912	484	14.59%	855	25.77%	1,979	59.64%
1916	1,612	41.82%	1,968	51.05%	275	7.13%
1920	4,759	63.67%	1,282	17.15%	1,433	19.17%
1924	3,222	40.16%	222	2.77%	4,578	57.07%
1928	5,780	67.82%	2,481	29.11%	261	3.06%
1932	2,674	30.04%	5,813	65.31%	414	4.65%
1936	2,500	26.25%	6,595	69.25%	429	4.50%
1940	4,263	36.94%	7,187	62.28%	90	0.78%
1944	3,784	36.55%	6,482	62.61%	87	0.84%
1948	3,666	31.62%	7,204	62.14%	723	6.24%
1952	6,370	49.97%	6,264	49.14%	113	0.89%
1956	5,445	44.25%	6,834	55.54%	26	0.21%
1960	6,786	50.02%	6,738	49.66%	43	0.32%
1964	4,011	30.49%	9,108	69.23%	37	0.28%
1968	5,086	37.96%	7,639	57.01%	675	5.04%
1972	6,624	45.74%	7,241	50.00%	616	4.25%
1976	6,664	38.90%	9,992	58.33%	474	2.77%
1980	8,480	46.86%	8,038	44.42%	1,577	8.72%
1984	9,539	52.69%	8,402	46.41%	163	0.90%
1988	8,634	48.34%	8,962	50.17%	266	1.49%
1992	6,784	34.51%	7,914	40.26%	4,958	25.22%
1996	7,119	38.41%	9,009	48.61%	2,404	12.97%
2000	10,026	51.99%	8,220	42.62%	1,039	5.39%
2004	11,704	54.82%	9,337	43.74%	308	1.44%
2008	11,319	51.70%	10,125	46.24%	451	2.06%
2012	11,240	52.36%	9,805	45.68%	420	1.96%
2016	12,785	58.72%	7,266	33.37%	1,721	7.90%
2020	14,437	61.78%	8,440	36.12%	490	2.10%
2024	15,014	64.48%	7,814	33.56%	455	1.95%

== See also ==
- Kandiyohi County Historical Society
- National Register of Historic Places listings in Kandiyohi County, Minnesota
- Category:People from Willmar, Minnesota
