= Kidnapping of Jayme Closs =

2018 double homicide and child abduction in Barron, Wisconsin

Kidnapping of Jayme Lynn Closs
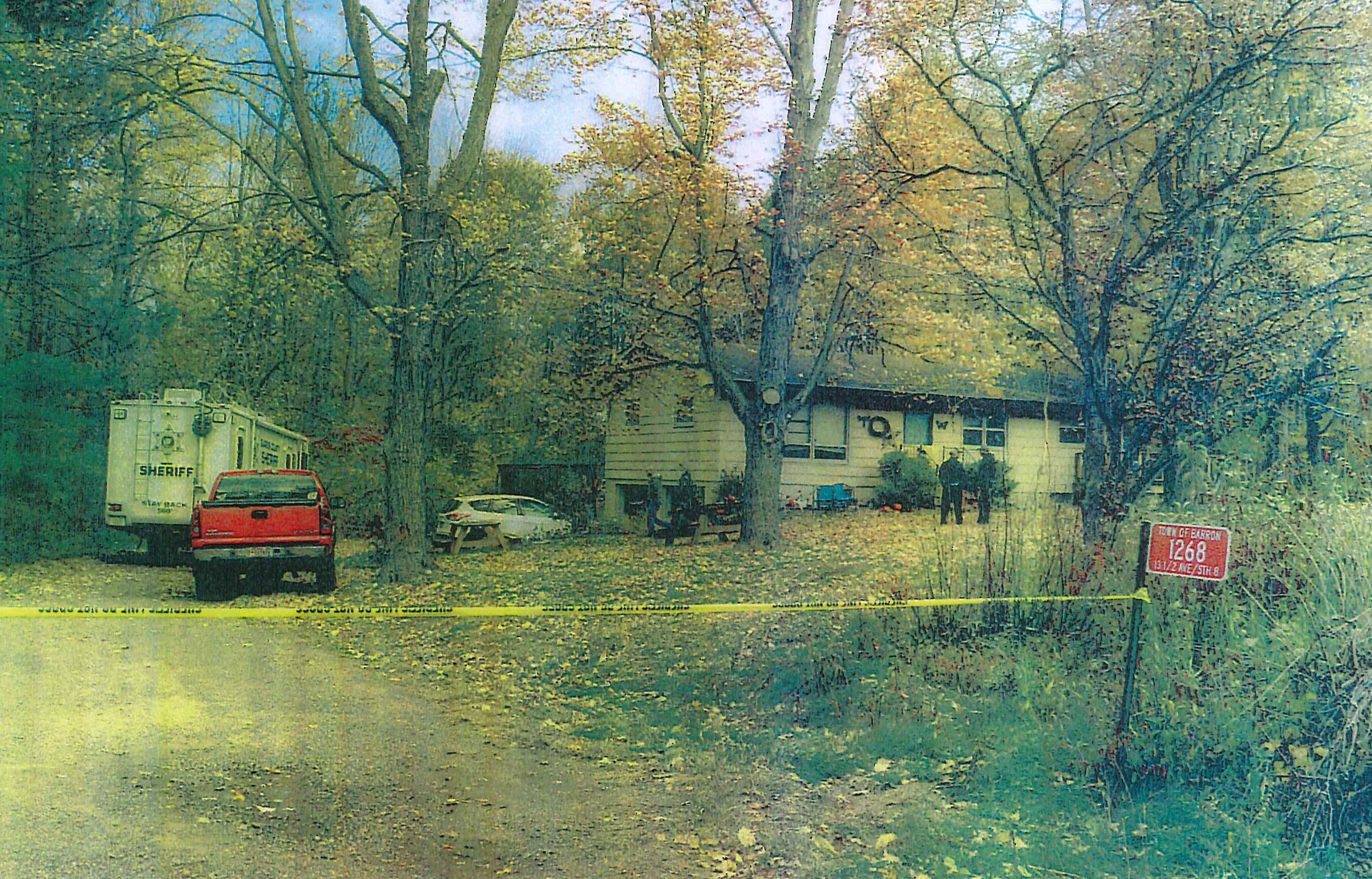
- The Closs family home in Barron, Wisconsin, north of Highway 8, where the murders and kidnapping took place.

- Kidnapping of Jayme Closs (Wisconsin)
- Location: 45°24′06.0″N 91°53′54.3″W Abduction: 1268 U.S. 8, Barron, Wisconsin, U.S; Confinement: 14166 South Eau Claire Acres Circle, Gordon, Wisconsin, U.S.
- Date: October 15, 2018– January 10, 2019 (UTC−06:00)
- Attack type: Double-murder by shooting, home invasion, child abduction
- Deaths: 2
- Victims: Murdered: James Closs, aged 56 (father); Denise Closs, aged 46 (mother); Kidnapped: Jayme Lynn Closs
- Perpetrator: Jake Thomas Patterson
- Motive: Sexual gratification
- Verdict: Pleaded guilty
- Convictions: First-degree intentional homicide (2 counts), kidnapping (Note: One count of armed burglary dropped.)
- Sentence: Two consecutive life sentences without the possibility of parole (LWOP), plus 40 years

On October 15, 2018, Jayme Lynn Closs, then 13-years old, was abducted by 21-year-old Jake Thomas Patterson. He had fatally shot both her parents, James and Denise Closs, at their home just outside of Barron, Wisconsin, at 12:53 a.m. Patterson took Closs to a cabin 70 miles (110 km) away in rural Gordon, Wisconsin, and held her in captivity for 88 days. She escaped on January 10, 2019, and sought help from neighbors.

Police took Patterson into custody; shortly after, he told them he had kidnapped Closs and murdered her parents. He pleaded guilty to two counts of first-degree intentional homicide and one count of kidnapping. On May 24, 2019, Patterson was sentenced to two consecutive life sentences in prison without the possibility of parole (LWOP), plus an additional consecutive 40 years. After her recovery, Jayme Closs lived with an aunt and an uncle.

Closs has become an advocate for other missing and exploited children. Her story has been widely reported and has raised awareness about the issue of child abduction and the need for greater support for victims and their families.

== Kidnapping ==
Jayme Lynn Closs (born July 13, 2005) is the only child of James and Denise Closs of Barron, Wisconsin. Jake Patterson, who did not know the Closs family, saw Closs in front of her family home waiting for the school bus in September 2018. In October, Patterson drove to the Closs home in his first attempt to kidnap her, but was deterred by activity in the home. Patterson made a second attempt two days later but again aborted for the same reason.

On October 15, he made a third visit, this time armed with a shotgun. Shortly before 12:53 a.m. Central Time (05:53 UTC), Patterson parked his car at the end of the driveway. Wearing a black coat and ski mask, he approached the front door of the home, carrying the shotgun. James Closs, 56, shone a light on Patterson through a glass pane in the front door. Closs apparently mistook him for a police officer and asked him to show him his badge. Patterson called out, "Open the fucking door!" James responded again by asking Patterson to identify himself. Patterson fired the gun, fatally shooting Closs. Forcing his way into the house, Patterson checked every room because he wanted "no witnesses left behind."

He found the bathroom door locked and began trying to knock it down. Inside the bathroom were Denise Closs, 46, and Jayme, 13. Denise was comforting Jayme, who was crying loudly. At 12:53 a.m., Denise Closs made a 911 call.

While Denise Closs did not speak, the operator heard a disturbance and yelling before the phone call disconnected. When the dispatcher called the number back, they reached the voicemail of Denise. Patterson bound Jayme's wrists and ankles using duct tape, then fatally shot Denise Closs. He dragged Jayme outside, placed her in the trunk of his car, and drove away. The police arrived four minutes after the 911 call. Patterson later told investigators that he pulled over 20 seconds down the road from the house. Deputies sped by with emergency lights and sirens on. Neighbors said they heard two gunshots but dismissed them since hunting was common around their homes. After arriving at his cabin, Patterson made Closs change into a different pair of pajamas.

Less than two weeks after Jayme's abduction, a man burglarized the Closs family home, stealing some of Jayme's clothing. He was arrested, but not considered a suspect in the abduction and double murder.

== Captivity and escape ==
During Closs' captivity, Patterson threatened her that "bad things would happen" to her if she tried to escape. When Patterson left the home, he hid Closs underneath his bed, which he barricaded with bins containing weightlifting equipment, so she could not see out and it would be apparent if she attempted to escape. Patterson's father regularly visited the cabin on Saturdays, so Patterson hid her under the bed on those days, and turned up the radio to drown out any noise she might make.

Patterson hid Closs under his bed for up to 12 hours at a time with no food, water, or bathroom breaks. At Christmas time, Patterson left his home to visit his grandparents in Superior, Wisconsin, 45 minutes away in Gordon, and left her under his bed for several hours. Closs says she once accidentally moved a bin, and Patterson threatened that bad things would happen if she did it again. Closs says once when she upset Patterson, he hit her "really hard" on the back with a curtain rod.

Patterson believed Closs was too afraid of him to make any escape attempts. He "never put special locks on doors because she wouldn’t escape." They also slept on the same bed. Patterson rarely let Closs leave the cabin, only doing so for brief walks on the lawn after checking for bystanders.

On the afternoon of January 10, 2019, Patterson told Closs he was leaving for a couple of hours. He put her under his bed before boxing her inside with his belongings as usual. After he departed, Closs pushed out the objects around the bed. She ran from the house wearing a light shirt, leggings, and a pair of Patterson's sneakers. Closs encountered a local woman, Jeanne Nutter, walking her dog, Henry. Nutter recognized Closs from news reports and immediately took her to a neighbor's house. After police were called, Closs told them "Jake Patterson" killed her parents, took her, and kept her prisoner a few houses away from her current location. The neighbors described Closs as calm, quiet, dazed, and surprised that they recognized her from news coverage.

The police arrived around 4:45 p.m. and removed Closs from the area for her safety. Her description of Patterson and his vehicle enabled deputies to spot his car just minutes afterwards when Patterson, knowing that Closs had escaped and in search of her, drove by the house. After a deputy stopped him, Patterson exited his vehicle and said, "I did it." He was arrested shortly after and brought to the Douglas County Sheriff's Office in Superior for questioning.

A hospital admitted Closs under guard. The next morning, it released her to the custody of her aunt, Jennifer Smith. Hormel, the parent company of the Jennie-O plant where Closs's parents worked, had contributed to a reward fund in the case. On January 24 they announced they would grant $25,000 reward money to Closs because she had rescued herself.

== Perpetrator ==
Jake Thomas Patterson
- Born: June 17, 1997 (age 29)
- Education: Northwood High School
- Height: 5 ft 11 in (180 cm)
- Status: Incarcerated
- Criminal charges: Two counts of first-degree intentional homicide and one count of kidnapping
- Penalty: Two consecutive life sentences without the possibility of parole plus 40 years

Details
- Imprisoned at: Penitentiary of New Mexico

Patterson's parents divorced in 2007. He graduated from Northwood High School in nearby Minong, Wisconsin in 2015. He enlisted in the U.S. Marine Corps, but was discharged after one month at MCRD San Diego. Patterson had no prior criminal history in the state of Wisconsin.

Police did not believe Patterson had social media contact with Closs or her family and relatives of Closs did not recognize Patterson's name. Patterson told authorities he saw Closs getting on a school bus outside the family residence in September while driving to work and "knew that she was the girl I wanted to take". The day Closs escaped, Patterson applied for a job at a liquor distribution facility in Superior, Wisconsin.

Patterson's grandfather stated, "Something went terribly wrong, nobody had any clues... We are absolutely heartbroken. It's wrenching to deal with. He was shy and quiet, he backed off from crowds, but a nice boy, polite. Computer games were more of a priority than social interaction."

== Legal proceedings ==
Authorities began questioning Patterson after his transport to the Douglas County Sheriff's Office. Patterson confessed immediately to kidnapping Closs and killing her parents. On January 14, Patterson appeared in a Barron County courthouse to be charged with two counts of first-degree intentional homicide, one count of kidnapping, and one count of armed burglary. Barron County Circuit Court Judge James Babler set his bail at $5 million. At Patterson's arraignment, his father told a reporter that he had a note of apology that he was trying to get to Closs. Patterson appeared again in person in court on February 6, 2019, and waived his right to a preliminary examination.

About a month later, in March, Patterson wrote a letter to a reporter with KARE 11 News in Minneapolis, responding to the reporter's questions about the case. Patterson expressed intent to plead guilty, stating he "didn't want Jayme and her family to worry about a trial." Patterson denied claims from authorities that he planned the murders and kidnapping, saying that they were "mostly on impulse." Patterson apologized for the crimes, saying "I can't believe I did this" and that he couldn't express how sorry he was for hurting Jayme. On the back of the letter, Patterson wrote in bubble letters "I'm sorry Jayme! For everything. I know it doesn't mean much."

Later that month, a television reporter with WCCO in Minneapolis received a cellphone call from Patterson in which he briefly answered questions sent to him in a letter. Regarding the time Closs spent in captivity, Patterson said, "We were just like watching TV, playing board games, talking about stuff. We cooked a lot, everything we made was homemade, you know".

On March 27, Patterson appeared in court again to agree to plead guilty to the two counts of first-degree intentional homicide, and the kidnapping charge. The charge of armed burglary was dismissed, but read in. Prosecutors from both Barron County and Douglas County, where Closs was held, decided not to pursue charges for any potential crimes committed at Patterson's home, as they did not want to bring Closs in for questioning and believed sufficient evidence existed to pursue a life sentence without additional charges. Patterson pled guilty to the first three counts, and the judge revoked his bond. As Patterson left the courtroom, he shouted "Bye, Jayme!" at the courtroom camera.

On May 24, during Patterson's sentencing, several members of Closs's family gave victim impact statements. While Closs was not at the sentencing hearing, a family attorney read a statement on her behalf. In her statement, Closs says her parents and her home "were the most important things in her life" and that Patterson "took them away from her in a way that will always leave her with a horrifying memory." Closs described how everyday activities such as going out in public have been difficult due to a lack of a sense of safety. Closs stated that there are things Patterson could never take from her. She stated that Patterson "thought that he could own her, but he was wrong." She asked the judge to lock Patterson up forever.

Patterson's attorneys argued for a sentence of life with a possibility of parole far down the road, which would enable him with rehabilitative programs in prison. They argued that the crimes were a result of an impulsive act caused by Patterson's "self-imposed isolating behaviors". They also stated that they advised Patterson not to cooperate with the presentence investigation, due to its writer including "personal opinion" and "attempts at diagnosing Mr. Patterson with certain mental health diagnoses", and asked the court not to follow the PSI. The judge stated that life with the chance of parole would be redundant, as Patterson had no diagnosis or sign of any psychopathic behavior or mental disorder warranting rehabilitative programs. The judge also stated it was evident Patterson had planned the crimes well in advance. The judge read aloud a portion of the pre-sentencing investigation regarding statements Patterson made about his crimes both orally and in writing, including that he started having "fantasies about keeping a young girl prisoner, torturing her, and totally controlling her." Patterson stated before he kidnapped Closs, he planned on "taking multiple girls, killing multiple families," and that when he first encountered Jayme, he "instantly thought she would be a good target." The judge sentenced Patterson to the maximum of life in prison without the eligibility for parole on the murder charges, plus an additional 40 years for the kidnapping.

On June 20, Jake Patterson was registered officially as a sex offender. In July, he was transferred from the Dodge Correctional Institution to an out-of-state prison in New Mexico. In August 2019, while in the New Mexico prison, he got into a fight with another inmate.

On December 20, the Wisconsin Department of Justice released all the investigative files into the Closs case. Several portions of the files are redacted out of respect for Closs's privacy, including her interview after her escape.

== Media ==
On April 27, 2019, a documentary titled Smart Justice: The Jayme Closs Case premiered on the Lifetime network. The documentary is hosted by Elizabeth Ann Smart, a high-profile kidnapping survivor and advocate for missing and exploited children. Joining Smart in the documentary are female high-profile kidnapping survivors Kara Robinson, Gina DeJesus, Katie Beers, Denise Huskins, Sarah Maynard, and Alicia Kozaciewicz, all of whom discuss Jayme's case as well as their own, and offer their own perspectives on healing and recovery.

== See also ==
- Joseph Edward Duncan, American serial killer who abducted two children after murdering their parents
- List of homicides in Wisconsin
- List of solved missing person cases (2010s)
