= KBMO =

Simulcast of KWLM, Willmar
- Benson, Minnesota; United States
- Broadcast area: Benson and immediate surrounding areas
- Frequency: 1290 kHz
- Branding: KWLM

Programming
- Format: News/Talk

Ownership
- Owner: Lakeland Media, LLC
- Sister stations: KSCR-FM; KWLM; KKLN; KOLV; KQIC; KLFN

History
- First air date: December 1956
- Former call signs: KBMO (1956–1990); KSCR (1990–2000)
- Call sign meaning: Benson, Minnesota

Technical information
- Licensing authority: FCC
- Facility ID: 54253
- Class: D
- Power: 330 watts (day); 24 watts (night)
- Transmitter coordinates: 45°19′06″N 95°33′48″W
- Translator: 103.5 K278CX (Benson))

Links
- Public license information: Public file; LMS
- Website: www.bensonradio.com

KBMO (1290 kHz) is a commercial AM radio station licensed to Benson, Minnesota, United States. The station, established in 1956, is owned by Lakeland Media, LLC. Programming is also heard on FM translator K278CX at 103.5 MHz.

KBMO broadcasts a news/talk format, simulcasting sister station KWLM in Willmar.

== History ==
KBMO began regular broadcast operations in December 1956 under the ownership of Arline H. Steinbach. In 1960, it was acquired by North Star Broadcasting Company, Inc.

In October 1982, North Star Broadcasting Company, Inc., reached an agreement to sell KBMO to Joseph John Garamella, M.D. The deal was approved by the Federal Communications Commission (FCC) on December 16, 1982.

In December 1988, Joseph John Garamella, M.D., filed an application with the FCC to transfer the broadcast license for this station to a new company called Garamella Broadcasting Company. The transfer was approved by the FCC on January 18, 1989, and the transaction was consummated on March 1, 1989. The new company applied for a new call sign and the station was assigned KSCR by the FCC on February 26, 1990.

In September 1991, Garamella Broadcasting Company agreed to sell this station to Davies Broadcasting Company. The deal was approved by the FCC on November 8, 1991, and the transaction was consummated on November 15, 1991.

In March 1994, Davies Broadcasting Company reached an agreement to sell this station to Quest Broadcasting, Inc. The deal was approved by the FCC on April 12, 1994, and the transaction was consummated on May 2, 1994.

The station was re-assigned the heritage KBMO' call sign by the FCC on February 10, 2000.

In October 2013, Quest Broadcasting reached an agreement to sell KBMO (and sister station KSCR-FM) to Headwaters Media, LLC for $275,000. The FCC approved the deal on January 10, 2014, and the transaction was formally consummated on February 28, 2014.
