= List of Alpha Gamma Rho members =

The following is a list of notable members of the Alpha Gamma Rho fraternity.

== Academia ==
- Emil M. Mrak (UC Berkeley, Beta - Initiated at UC Davis, Phi) - 2nd Chancellor of the University of California, Davis
- Steven Leath (Iowa State, Eta, Alumnus Initiate) – president of Auburn University
- Francis Tuttle (Oklahoma State, Pi) – director of Oklahoma Vo Tech System
- Randy Woodson (Purdue University, Delta, Alumnus Initiate) – Chancellor of North Carolina State University
- Ronnie Green (Virginia Tech, Beta Eta) – Chancellor of University of Nebraska – Lincoln

== Agriculture ==
- Norman Borlaug – agronomist, Nobel Peace Prize winner
- Walter Clore – (Oklahoma State University, Pi), pioneer in wine growing and agricultural research

== Business ==
- Taylor Brown (Montana State University, Alpha Delta) – owner of Northern Ag radio and TV network
- Wallace Jerome – founder of "The Turkey Store", of Jennie-O Turkey Store Company
- Peter Oppenheimer (Cal Poly - San Luis Obispo, Chi) – CFO of Apple Inc.
- James Cash Penney (University of Missouri, Theta) – founder of JC Penney Department Stores
- Orville Redenbacher (Purdue University, Delta) – popcorn magnate
- Orion Samuelson – farm broadcaster
- Donnie Smith (University of Tennessee – Knoxville, Alpha Kappa) – chief executive officer of Tyson Foods

== Military ==
- Orville Emil Bloch (North Dakota State, Epsilon) – Medal of Honor recipient
- Edgar H. Lloyd (University of Arkansas, Alpha Iota) – Medal of Honor recipient
- Harry J. Michael – Medal of Honor recipient

== Politics ==
- Wayne Allard – United States Senator for Colorado
- Gary Black (University of Georgia, Alpha Eta) – Georgia Commissioner of Agriculture
- Terry Branstad (Iowa State University, Eta, Alumnus Initiate) – Governor of Iowa
- Charles Bronson (University of Georgia, Alpha Eta) – former Florida Commissioner of Agriculture
- Samuel Brownback (Kansas State University, Alpha Zeta) – Governor of the State of Kansas; United States Senator for Kansas; former, and youngest-ever Secretary of Agriculture of the state of Kansas; former US Representative
- Conrad Burns – United States Senator for Montana
- Earl Butz (Purdue) – former Secretary of Agriculture
- Doyle Conner – (University of Florida, Alpha Gamma), Agriculture Commissioner of Florida
- Ken Givens (Alpha Kappa) – Tennessee Commissioner of Agriculture
- Charles Grassley (Iowa State University, Eta)- United States Senator for Iowa
- Seth Hammett (Auburn University, Xi) – director of economic development for Alabama Electric Cooperative; former Speaker of the Alabama House of Representatives (member 1979–2011)
- Patrick Hooker (Cornell, Zeta) – New York State Commissioner of Agriculture
- Tommy Irvin (University of Georgia, Alpha Eta) – former Georgia Commissioner of Agriculture
- Tom Latham (Iowa State University, Eta)- US Representative, Iowa
- Jerry Litton – US Representative, Missouri
- Jefferson Miller – US Representative, Florida
- Devin Nunes – US Representative, California
- John Perdue (West Virginia, Alpha Alpha) – State Treasurer of West Virginia
- Rick Perry (Texas A&M, Beta Nu) – Governor of Texas
- Adam Putnam (University of Florida, Alpha Gamma) – Agriculture Commissioner of Florida; US Representative, Florida
- Robert L.F. Sikes (University of Georgia, Alpha Eta) – former US Representative, Florida
- Nick Smith – US Representative, Michigan
- Greg Steube (University of Florida) – member of Florida House of Representatives
- Gerald Weller – US Representative, Illinois
- Joe Don McGaugh- Missouri Associate Circuit Judge, former state representative
- Shawn Jasper – (University of New Hampshire) New Hampshire Commissioner of Agriculture
- Brian Munzlinger (University of Missouri, Theta)- Missouri State Senator, majority whip, chairman of Missouri Senate Agriculture Committee
- Barry Moore (Auburn University, Xi)- US Representative, Alabama

== Sports ==
- Todd Buchanan (Murray State University) - college basketball coach
- Spud Chandler (University of Georgia, Alpha Eta) – professional baseball player
- Scott Hatteberg (Washington State University, Sigma) – professional baseball player
- Tim Phillips (Ohio State University, Beta) – professional swimmer
- Allie Reynolds (Oklahoma State, Pi) – professional baseball player
