= KDJS =

KDJS may refer to:

- KDJS (AM), a radio station (1590 AM) licensed to Willmar, Minnesota, United States
- KDJS-FM, a radio station (95.3 FM) licensed to Willmar, Minnesota, United States
