= James Beckwith =

James Beckwith may refer to:

- James Carroll Beckwith (1852–1917), American painter
- James R. Beckwith (1857–1935), Wisconsin politician
- James Beckwith (musician), British musician
