= KSCR-FM =

- Benson, Minnesota; United States
- Broadcast area: Swift County, Minnesota
- Frequency: 93.5 MHz
- RDS: PI: 3FCD; PS/RT: Artist - Title on Country Legends 93.5
- Branding: 93.5 Country Legends

Programming
- Format: Classic country
- Affiliations: Minnesota News Network; Vikings Radio Network

Ownership
- Owner: Lakeland Media, LLC
- Sister stations: KBMO; KKLN; KWLM; KQIC; KOLV; KLFN

History
- First air date: 1969
- Former call signs: KBMO-FM (1968–1985); KSCR (1985–1990)
- Call sign meaning: Swift County Radio

Technical information
- Licensing authority: FCC
- Facility ID: 54254
- Class: C3
- ERP: 50,000 watts
- HAAT: 100 meters (330 ft)
- Transmitter coordinates: 45°19′6″N 95°33′48″W

Links
- Public license information: Public file; LMS
- Webcast: Listen live
- Website: www.willmarradio.com/country_legends/

KSCR-FM (93.5 FM; "93.5 Country Legends") is a radio station broadcasting a classic country music format. Licensed to Benson, Minnesota, United States, the station is owned by Lakeland Media, LLC.

== History ==
The 93.5 FM facility in Benson, Minnesota, traces to KBMO-FM, which was first licensed on July 17, 1969, and was listed in Bruce F. Elving's early-1970s FM Atlas and Station Directory as "Benson 93.5 KBMO-FM". In 1975, the Federal Communications Commission (FCC) granted KBMO-FM a construction permit to install a new transmitter and antenna, operate with 3,000 watts effective radiated power at 165 feet (50 m) above average terrain, and use remote control from its main studio at 1209 Pacific Avenue in Benson.

North Star Broadcasting Inc. sold the station in the early 1980s. In December 1982, the FCC granted the assignment of KBMO-FM from North Star to Todd Jonathan Garamella for $270,000; the companion AM station, KBMO, was assigned separately to Todd Garamella's father, Joseph John Garamella. The FM station changed call letters to KSCR in 1985.

In 1991, Garamella Broadcasting Co. sold the KSCR AM-FM combination to Davies Broadcasting Co. for $200,000. The FCC granted the assignment on November 8, 1991. The stations were later proposed for assignment from Davies Broadcasting to Quest Broadcasting, Inc.; The M Street Journal listed KSCR 1290/93.5 in Benson among proposed station transfers in March 1994. By 2005, Quest Broadcasting held the KSCR-FM license, as reflected in an FCC renewal grant for the station.

Quest Broadcasting sold KSCR-FM and KBMO to Headwaters Media, LLC, in a $275,000 transaction filed with the FCC in October 2013. The FCC granted the assignment of KSCR-FM from Quest Broadcasting to Headwaters Media on January 10, 2014. After the sale, the station dropped a satellite-fed classic rock format and adopted a locally originated mix of country, rock, oldies, and pop.

In 2025, Lakeland Media LLC reached a deal to buy KSCR-FM, KBMO, translator K278CX, and KKLN from Headwaters Media. The asset purchase agreement filed with the FCC listed a purchase price of $375,000, including a consulting agreement with John Jennings, who owned Headwaters Media. The FCC accepted KSCR-FM's assignment application from Headwaters Media to Lakeland Media for filing on February 7, 2025.

Following the Lakeland sale, KSCR-FM and KBMO stunted with patriotic music over the Fourth of July weekend before launching new formats on July 7, 2025. KSCR-FM changed from its broad classic hits "Radio with Roots" format to classic country as "93.5 Country Legends"; KBMO moved to a news/talk simulcast of sister station KWLM in Willmar. Around the same period, KSCR-FM was authorized to increase power from 25,000 to 50,000 watts while retaining its Benson-area transmitter site and 100-meter antenna height above average terrain. The FCC granted the station's license to cover for the upgraded facility on February 27, 2026.
