= KQIC =

Coordinates: 45.194°N 95.084°W

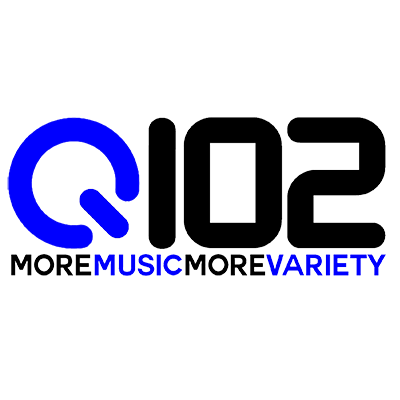
- Willmar, Minnesota; United States
- Broadcast area: Central Minnesota
- Frequency: 102.5 MHz
- RDS: PI: 3B12; PS/RT: Artist - Title on Q102
- Branding: Q102

Programming
- Format: Hot adult contemporary

Ownership
- Owner: Lakeland Media, LLC.
- Sister stations: KLFN; KOLV; KWLM; KSCR-FM; KKLN; KBMO

History
- First air date: July 1, 1965 (as KWLM-FM)
- Former call signs: KWLM-FM (1965-1972)
- Call sign meaning: Quick In Come

Technical information
- Licensing authority: FCC
- Facility ID: 36378
- Class: C1
- ERP: 100,000 watts
- HAAT: 253 meters

Links
- Public license information: Public file; LMS
- Webcast: Listen live
- Website: www.willmarradio.com/q102/

KQIC (102.5 FM) is an American radio station located in Willmar, Minnesota, United States. The station is owned by Lakeland Media.

KQIC has a strong signal that can be picked up across most of Central Minnesota. It began as an AOR station in the 1960s, but now features a hot adult contemporary format.

== History ==
KQIC originated as the FM sister station to KWLM, the Willmar station founded by Harry Linder that signed on October 5, 1940. The FM station began as KWLM-FM in 1965. At the time, FM broadcasting still had a limited audience in the area, and Lakeland Broadcasting later stated that the station aired automated music on large reels to maintain the license. The station also used its FM subcarrier to provide Muzak/background music service to local stores and other businesses.

In 1972, after Steve Linder returned to Willmar, KWLM-FM was developed as a contemporary music station. An advertisement for "The All-New KWLM-FM 102.5" promoted a January 3, 1972, relaunch with contemporary music, news, weather and sports. Later that year, KWLM-FM changed its call letters to KQIC; Broadcasting reported in March 1972 that KWLM-FM had been granted the KQIC-FM call sign. Lakeland Broadcasting's history described the early KQIC facility as operating with 70,000 watts from a 465-foot (142 m) tower.

KQIC-FM adopted the "Q102" branding in 1980. Around the same period, the station promoted itself through the Q102 Mobile Studio, a mobile disco and remote-broadcast vehicle used at local events in the Willmar area.

Steve Linder purchased Lakeland Broadcasting in 1990. In 1991, Broadcasting reported that KWLM and KQIC were being sold by Business Music Inc. to Steven W. Linder for $691,937. The same listing described KQIC as an adult contemporary station on 102.5 MHz operating with 100,000 watts.

During the 1990s, Q102 and the other Lakeland stations moved toward computer-based production and playback. Lakeland Broadcasting's history states that a major transition to a digital delivery system for music, commercials and programs occurred in 1997.

In September 2023, Lakeland Broadcasting agreed to sell its Willmar stations, including KQIC, to Lakeland Media LLC, owned by J. David Linder and Lynn Ketelsen. NorthPine reported that the transaction also included KWLM, KLFN and two KWLM translators, with a purchase price of $1.525 million. The sale had closed by January 16, 2024.

== Affiliation ==
KQIC (Q102) in Minnesota is in the Lakeland Media LLC group, which includes KOLV (100.1 Big Country), KLFN (106.5 The Train), KWLM (News/Talk 1340), KKLN (94.1 The Loon), KSCR (93.5 Country Legends), KBMO-AM FM (1290 AM 103.5 FM).

The weekday lineup includes The Q102 Morning Show with MaryElin and Steve, MaryElin Macht, Victoria on middays, Eric Grieger on afternoons and Rob Ryan on evenings. During the workday, dayparts are supplemented with news updates from J.P. Cola and hourly sports updates from Jason Brandt, as well as agricultural news from the Linder Farm Network.

KQIC airs syndicated weekend programs American Top 40, Sonrise and Lovelight Radio.
