= KLFN =

- Sunburg, Minnesota; United States
- Broadcast area: Willmar, Minnesota
- Frequency: 106.5 MHz
- Branding: 106.5 The Train

Programming
- Format: Classic hits

Ownership
- Owner: Lakeland Broadcasting Company
- Sister stations: KWLM, KOLV, KQIC, KSCR-FM, KKLN, KBMO

History
- First air date: 2003

Technical information
- Licensing authority: FCC
- Facility ID: 85513
- Class: A
- ERP: 6,000 watts
- HAAT: 100 meters (330 ft)
- Transmitter coordinates: 45°22′14″N 95°08′28″W

Links
- Public license information: Public file; LMS
- Website: willmarradio.com/the_train

KLFN (106.5 FM, "106.5 The Train") is a radio station licensed to Sunburg, Minnesota. The station broadcasts a classic hits format and is owned by Lakeland Broadcasting Company. The station is an affiliate of the Linder Farm Network, broadcasting agricultural news and market updates that target the farming communities surrounding Sunburg and Willmar.

== History ==
KLFN officially began broadcasting in 2003. The station is owned and operated by the Lakeland Broadcasting Company, a subsidiary of the Linder family's media interests. It operates as a sister station to the heritage news/talk outlet KWLM and the classic rock station KKLN. In January 2024, control of the station was officially transferred to Lakeland Media LLC, a partnership between J. David Linder and Lynn Ketelsen. This acquisition was part of a broader $1.5 million deal that included heritage sister stations KWLM, KQIC, and KOLV. In early 2025, the group further expanded by acquiring Benson-based stations KSCR-FM and KBMO to create a larger regional broadcasting network.
