= KOLV =

- Olivia, Minnesota; United States
- Broadcast area: Willmar, Minnesota; Redwood Falls, Minnesota; Montevideo, Minnesota
- Frequency: 100.1 MHz
- Branding: Big Country 100.1

Programming
- Format: Country music

Ownership
- Owner: Lakeland Media LLC
- Sister stations: KWLM; KLFN; KQIC; KSCR-FM; KBMO; KKLN

History
- First air date: June 27, 1983
- Former frequencies: 101.7 MHz

Technical information
- Licensing authority: FCC
- Facility ID: 50285
- Class: C2
- ERP: 50,000 watts
- HAAT: 142 meters (466 ft)
- Transmitter coordinates: 44°58′14″N 95°14′59″W

Links
- Public license information: Public file; LMS
- Webcast: Listen live
- Website: www.bigcountry100.com

KOLV is a country music radio station licensed to Olivia, Minnesota, broadcasting on 100.1 FM. KOLV serves the areas of Willmar, Redwood Falls, and Montevideo, Minnesota, and is owned by Lakeland Media LLC.

== History ==
In 1982, the Federal Communications Commission (FCC) granted Olivia Broadcasting Company a construction permit for a new FM station in Olivia on 101.7 MHz. The station began operation in June 1983. George Blum, a longtime Upper Midwest broadcaster, and his wife Ruby built KOLV-FM after previous ownership and management work at stations in Wyoming, North Dakota, Montana, and Wisconsin.

The station moved to 100.1 MHz as part of an FCC allotment proceeding. To allow the co-channel WHMH-FM in Sauk Rapids to upgrade from class A to class C2, it was necessary for KOLV to be moved and its license to be modified accordingly, effective July 25, 1994.

In 1998, the Blums' Olivia Broadcasting Company sold KOLV to Bold Radio Inc. of Mankato for $335,000. Bold Radio was owned by Lynn C. Ketelsen and John and Steve Linder. Bold Radio in turn entered into a local marketing agreement with Steve Linder–owned Lakeland Broadcasting, owner of KQIC and KWLM in Willmar, for operational support and moved to upgrade the station's effective radiated power from 10,000 to 50,000 watts, retaining the local programming. The technical upgrade was expected to add Willmar and Hutchinson into the station's primary coverage area. Though KOLV formed part of the growing Lakeland cluster and was rebranded as Big Country 100.1, the company continued to maintain an Olivia studio. Lakeland Media LLC formally closed on its purchase of KOLV from Bold Radio on April 5, 2024, after having operated KOLV under the LMA.
