= KWLM =

- Willmar, Minnesota; United States
- Frequency: 1340 kHz
- Branding: News/Talk 1340 AM & 96.3 FM

Programming
- Language: English
- Format: News/talk
- Affiliations: ABC News Radio; NBC News Radio; Compass Media Networks; Premiere Networks; Westwood One; Minnesota Lynx; Minnesota Timberwolves; Minnesota Vikings

Ownership
- Owner: Lakeland Broadcasting Company
- Sister stations: KLFN; KOLV; KQIC; KSCR-FM; KKLN; KBMO

History
- First air date: October 5, 1940
- Call sign meaning: Wilmar, Minnesota

Technical information
- Licensing authority: FCC
- Facility ID: 35377
- Class: C
- Power: 1,000 watts unlimited
- Transmitter coordinates: 45°08′00″N 95°02′35″W
- Translators: 96.3 K242CF (Willmar); 101.1 K266CM (Sunburg)

Links
- Public license information: Public file; LMS
- Webcast: Listen live
- Website: www.willmarradio.com/kwlm/

KWLM (1340 AM, "News/Talk 1340 AM & 96.3 FM") is an American radio station licensed to serve the community of Willmar, Minnesota, since 1940. The station was assigned the call sign "KWLM" by the Federal Communications Commission (FCC).

The station's broadcast license is held by Lakeland Broadcasting Company. KWLM is one of four stations in the Lakeland Broadcasting Group, which includes KLFN ("106.5 The Train"), KOLV ("Big Country 100.1"), and KQIC ("Q102"). The station's AM signal is supplemented by FM translator K242CF at 96.3 MHz in Willmar, and in 2025, the station’s format was further expanded to relay on KBMO in Benson following an ownership acquisition.

== History ==
=== Establishment and early years ===
The Federal Communications Commission (FCC) granted Lakeland Broadcasting Company a construction permit for KWLM on May 8, 1940. The new station was authorized to operate with 100 watts on 1310 kHz. Harry W. Linder, a Willmar businessman and investor, held 76 percent of the company; M. R. Johnson and L. F. Johnson, both involved in the dairy business, each held 10 percent, and attorney V. W. Lindquist held the remaining 4 percent. The FCC granted the station's initial license on October 1.

KWLM began regular broadcasting at 6 a.m. on October 5, 1940, opening with "The Star-Spangled Banner". Its studios were on the third floor of the Willmar City Auditorium, and its transmitter and 150-foot (46 m) tower were located across Foot Lake, north of the First Street bridge and U.S. Highway 71. Contemporary FCC and broadcasting-industry records list the original frequency as 1310 kHz, rather than the 1340 kHz frequency used by the station beginning in 1941.

Jack Lynch was hired shortly before KWLM opened and became its first announcer. Harry Linder's son Willard "Bill" Linder, then 19, was also among the original announcing staff. Both men left for military service in 1942 and returned to KWLM in 1946. Lynch subsequently served as general manager for approximately 40 years. He retired from that position in 1986 but continued to conduct occasional interviews and perform sales work for the station.

Five weeks after signing on, KWLM broadcast storm information and messages during the Armistice Day Blizzard of November 11, 1940. The Pavek Museum later credited the station's performance during the storm with demonstrating the value of immediate radio communication in the rural Willmar area.

KWLM joined the Mutual Broadcasting System and the regional North Central Broadcasting System on March 24, 1941. Later that month, the frequency reallocations associated with the North American Regional Broadcasting Agreement moved KWLM from 1310 to 1340 kHz. Station listings published after the change recorded KWLM on 1340 kHz with 250 watts.

=== Postwar development ===
Lakeland constructed a two-story office and studio building at the transmitter site in 1952. A 1954 industry directory listed KWLM as an ABC affiliate using United Press news. The station operated with 250 watts from 6 a.m. until midnight. Harry Linder remained president and general manager, Lynch was commercial manager, and Joe Martinson, a KWLM announcer since 1947 who became known for local sports coverage, was program director.

Lakeland entered FM broadcasting in 1965 with KWLM-FM on 102.5 MHz. The FM station initially used automated music to meet the FCC's programming requirements, while a subsidiary communications authorization carried Muzak background music for businesses. In January 1972, KWLM-FM changed its call sign to KQIC and adopted a contemporary music format. Steve Linder, Harry Linder's grandson, returned to Willmar that year after graduating from Gustavus Adolphus College and joined the family broadcasting company.

As music programming increasingly shifted to FM, KWLM concentrated on local news, sports, agricultural information and community programming. Bud Hanson originated the call-in program Open Mic in 1972. During the same decade, Lynch began hosting Legislative Review, a program featuring Minnesota legislators. Lynn Ketelsen became KWLM's farm director in 1976, and Lakeland's agricultural programming was later organized as the Linder Farm Network, which was incorporated by 1986.

By the late 1980s, KWLM was operating 24 hours a day with 1,000 watts. A Minnesota Broadcasters Association directory described its format as full service and listed affiliations with ABC and the Linder Farm Network. Steve Linder purchased Lakeland Broadcasting in 1990. The company introduced computer-based digital storage and delivery of music, advertising and other programming in 1997, while KWLM continued to emphasize news, sports and information.

=== FM translators and later ownership ===
In 2011, Lakeland Broadcasting agreed to acquire the 170-watt translator K240CU on 95.9 MHz from Refuge Media Group for $100,000, together with as much as $10,000 toward the relocation of a replacement translator for the seller. The transfer application specified that K240CU would discontinue Refuge Media's Christian format and begin relaying KWLM's news-talk programming. The translator was subsequently moved to 96.3 MHz as K242CF, and KWLM began promoting the FM relay in 2012. By 2023, KWLM was also being relayed by K266CM on 101.1 MHz in Sunburg.

In September 2023, Lakeland Media LLC agreed to purchase KWLM, KQIC, KLFN and KWLM's two translators from Steve Linder's Lakeland Broadcasting Company for $1.525 million. Lakeland Media was divided equally between J. David Linder's Seagrape Trust and Lynn Ketelsen's Ketelsen Media; Matt Ketelsen was also named a manager of the company. The FCC granted the assignment of KWLM's license from Lakeland Broadcasting Company to Lakeland Media on November 30, 2023. The transaction closed on January 16, 2024.

On July 7, 2025, Lakeland Media changed KBMO in Benson and its translator K278CX on 103.5 MHz to a simulcast of KWLM's news-talk programming, extending the format into the Benson area.

== Alumni ==
Jack Lynch served the community for nearly 50 years as an on-air personality for KWLM. In addition, Lynch served on hospital and school boards as well as serving as mayor of Willmar from 1973 until 1976. Lynch died in 1999. He was the first announcer hired by the station, beginning his career just days before KWLM went on the air in October 1940.

== Translators ==
KWLM programming is also carried on two broadcast translator stations to extend or improve the coverage area of the station.

Call sign	Frequency	City of license	FID	ERP (W)	Class	FCC info
K242CF	(96.3 FM) FM	Willmar, Minnesota	78070	250	D	LMS
K266CM	(101.1 FM) FM	Sunburg, Minnesota	202344	250	D	LMS
