= Barron, Wisconsin =

- City
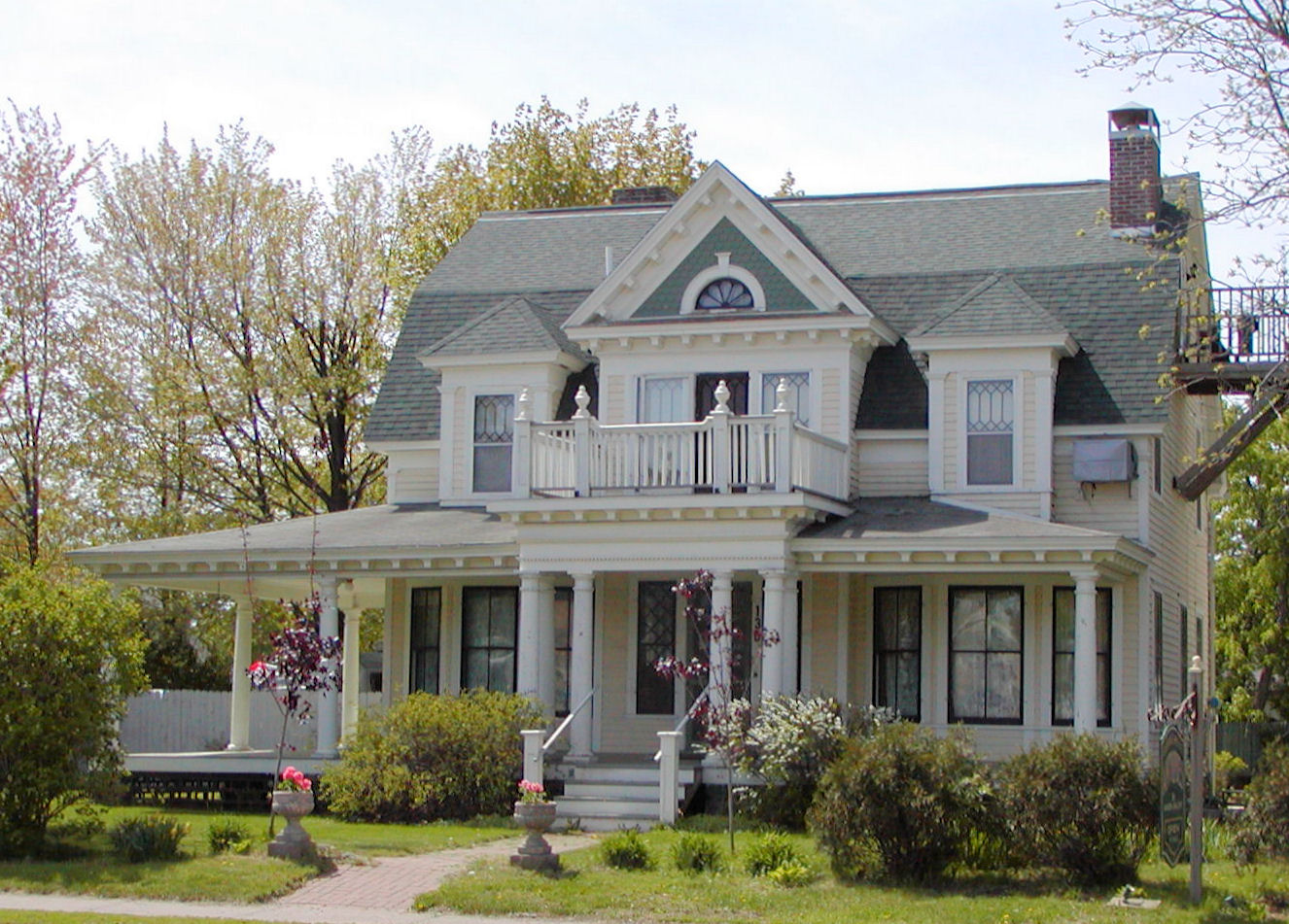
- Stebbins House, 130 E. Division Avenue

- Location of Barron in Barron County, Wisconsin

- Location within Wisconsin Location within the United States
- Coordinates: 45°24′2″N 91°50′53″W
- Country: United States
- State: Wisconsin
- County: Barron

Government
  - Mayor: Rod Nordby
  - City Administrator: Elizabeth Jacobson

Area
  - Total: 3.00 sq mi (7.77 km^{2})
  - Land: 2.92 sq mi (7.55 km^{2})
  - Water: 0.085 sq mi (0.22 km^{2})
- Elevation: 1,109 ft (338 m)

Population (2020)
  - Total: 3,733
  - Density: 1,280/sq mi (494.4/km^{2})
- Time zone: UTC-6 (Central (CST))
  - Summer (DST): UTC-5 (CDT)
- ZIP Code: 54812
- Area codes: 715 & 534
- FIPS code: 55-04875
- GNIS feature ID: 1561202
- Website: cityofbarron.com

Barron is a city in and the county seat of Barron County, Wisconsin, United States. The population was 3,733 at the 2020 census. The city is surrounded by the Town of Barron.

== History ==
Originally named Quaderer's Camp after local lumber foreman John Quaderer, the name was changed to Barron in honor of Henry D. Barron after the location became the county seat of Barron County, besting Rice Lake.

== Geography ==
Barron is located at 45°24′1″N 91°50′52″W (45.400527, -91.847948).

According to the United States Census Bureau, the city has a total area of 3.00 square miles (7.77 km^{2}), of which 2.92 square miles (7.56 km^{2}) is land and 0.08 square miles (0.21 km^{2}) is water.

Barron is located along U.S. Highway 8 and Wisconsin Highway 25.

== Demographics ==
Historical population
Census	Pop.	Note	%±
1880	183		—
1890	829		353.0%
1900	1,493		80.1%
1910	1,449		−2.9%
1920	1,623		12.0%
1930	1,863		14.8%
1940	2,059		10.5%
1950	2,355		14.4%
1960	2,338		−0.7%
1970	2,337		0.0%
1980	2,595		11.0%
1990	2,986		15.1%
2000	3,248		8.8%
2010	3,423		5.4%
2020	3,733		9.1%
U.S. Decennial Census

=== 2010 census ===
At the 2010 census, there were 3,423 people, 1,422 households and 829 families living in the city. The population density was 1,188.5 inhabitants per square mile (458.9/km^{2}). There were 1,526 housing units at an average density of 529.9 per square mile (204.6/km^{2}). The racial makeup was 87.2% White, 8.8% African American, 0.8% Native American, 0.7% Asian, 0.8% from other races, and 1.7% from two or more races. Hispanic or Latino people of any race were 3% of the population.

There were 1,422 households, of which 28.6% had children under the age of 18 living with them, 40% were married couples living together, 12.3% had a female householder with no husband present, 6% had a male householder with no wife present, and 41.7% were non-families. 33.8% of all households were made up of individuals, and 16% had someone living alone who was 65 years of age or older. The average household size was 2.27 and the average family size was 2.88.

The median age was 39.1 years. 21.9% of residents were under the age of 18; 10.3% were between the ages of 18 and 24; 24.7% were from 25 to 44; 25% were from 45 to 64; and 18.2% were 65 years of age or older. The gender makeup was 50.9% male and 49.1% female.

=== 2000 census ===
At the 2000 census, there were 3,248 people, 1,389 households and 837 families living in the city. The population density was 1,176.7 per square mile (454.4/km^{2}). There were 1,442 housing units at an average density of 522.4 per square mile (201.7/km^{2}). The racial makeup was 96.92% White, 0.62% Black or African American, 0.15% Native American, 0.25% Asian, 0.15% Pacific Islander, 1.05% from other races, and 0.86% from two or more races. Hispanic or Latino people of any race were 1.88% of the population.

There were 1,389 households, of which 28% had children under the age of 18 living with them, 44.2% were married couples living together, 11.2% had a female householder with no husband present, and 39.7% were non-families. 33.5% of all households were made up of individuals, and 18.4% had someone living alone who was 65 years of age or older. The average household size was 2.25 and the average family size was 2.83.

23.5% of the population were under the age of 18, 9.9% from 18 to 24, 26.6% from 25 to 44, 19.8% from 45 to 64, and 20.3% who were 65 years of age or older. The median age was 38 years. For every 100 females, there were 93.4 males. For every 100 females age 18 and over, there were 89.5 males.

The median household income was $33,281 and the median family income was $40,401. Males had a median income of $29,487 and females $19,926. The per capita income was $18,485. About 5.6% of families and 9.2% of the population were below the poverty line, including 6.7% of those under age 18 and 6.4% of those age 65 or over.

== Notable people ==
- John Anderson, Wisconsin state senator
- James R. Beckwith, Wisconsin state legislator and farmer
- Ray R. Clark, former mayor of Long Beach, California
- Jayme Closs, abduction victim and advocate for missing and exploited children
- Clarence Clinton Coe, Wisconsin state legislator
- Mark Hallberg, baseball player and coach
- Wallace Jerome, turkey industry innovator
- Chris Kroeze, runner-up on season 15 of The Voice
- Ben Hur Lampman, journalist who primarily worked in Oregon
- David Madson, gay rights activist and architect
- Charles C. McDonald, general in the United States Air Force
- Tom Sawyer, American football player and coach
- Norman C. Skogstad, flying ace of the United States Army Air Forces
- Jonathan J. Smith, Wisconsin state legislator and mayor of Barron
- Charles Simeon Taylor, Wisconsin state legislator and lawyer

== See also ==
- Barron High School
