= Wallace Gustafson =

American lawyer and politician (1925–2018)

Wallace Frank "Wally" Gustafson (January 21, 1925 – September 10, 2018) was an American lawyer and politician.

== Biography ==
Gustafson was born in Palmyra Township, Renville County, Minnesota and graduated from Bird Island High School, in Bird Island, Minnesota, in 1942. He served in the United States Navy in the Pacific during World War II. He received his bachelor's degree in business administration and his law degree from the University of Minnesota in 190. Gustafson practices law in Willmar, Minnesota. Gustafson served in the Minnesota House of Representatives from 1963 to 1972 and was involved in the Republican Party. Gustafson died at St. Cloud Hospital in St. Cloud, Minnesota.
