= Charles C. McDonald =

United States Air Force general

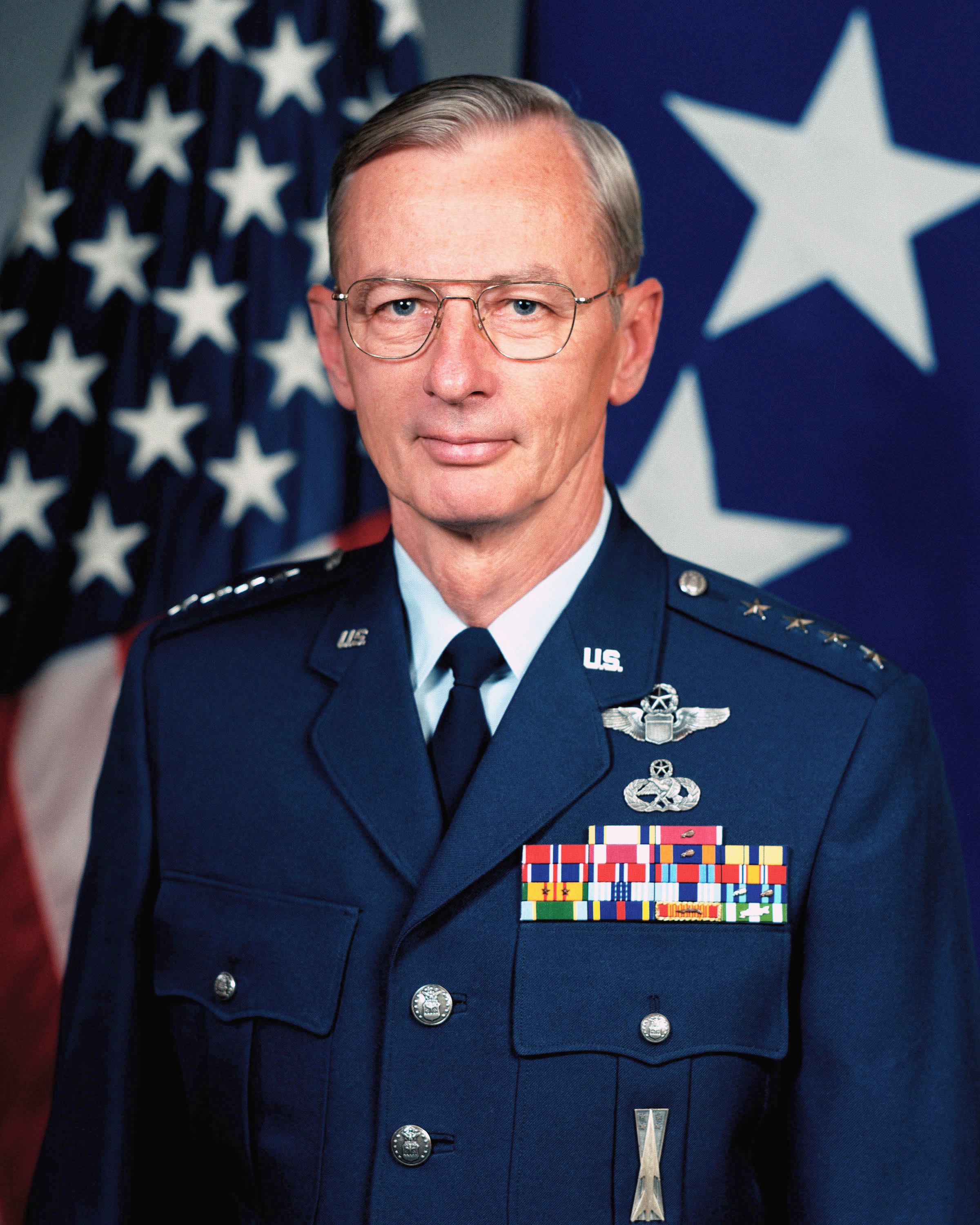
- General Charles C. McDonald
- Born: October 1, 1933; Barron, Wisconsin, US
- Died: November 22, 2017 (aged 84); Niceville, Florida, US
- Burial place: Barrancas National Cemetery
- Military career
- Branch: United States Air Force
- Service years: 1956–1992
- Rank: General
- Commands: Air Force Logistics Command
- Conflicts: Vietnam War

General Charles Clarence McDonald (October 1, 1933 – November 22, 2017) was a United States Air Force general who served as Commander, Air Force Logistics Command (COMAFLC) from 1989 to 1992.

McDonald was born in 1933, in Barron, Wisconsin, where he graduated from Barron High School in 1951. He earned a bachelor of science degree in biology from the University of Wisconsin in 1956 and a master of arts degree in education from the Interamerican University of Puerto Rico San Germán campus in San German, Puerto Rico, in 1966. He is a distinguished graduate of both Squadron Officer School in 1963 and Air War College in 1973.

In August 1956 he was commissioned as a second lieutenant through the Air Force Reserve Officer Training Corps program. He entered active service in June 1957 and completed pilot training in July 1958. From August 1958 until November 1961 he was a B-47 co-pilot at McConnell Air Force Base, Kansas, and Mountain Home Air Force Base, Idaho.

McDonald volunteered for the B-52 program and after completing combat crew training in March 1962, was assigned to the 319th Bombardment Wing at Grand Forks Air Force Base, North Dakota. There he was a B-52H co-pilot, aircraft commander and instructor pilot. In June 1965 he transferred to the 72nd Bombardment Wing, Ramey Air Force Base, Puerto Rico, as a wing standardization evaluator.

He served as a command briefer at Headquarters Strategic Air Command, Offutt Air Force Base, Nebraska, from June 1968 to May 1971. McDonald then began OV-10 training as a forward air controller and was assigned to the 20th Tactical Air Support Squadron at Da Nang Air Base, Republic of Vietnam, as squadron operations officer.

Returning to the United States, he entered Air War College at Maxwell Air Force Base, Alabama, graduating in May 1973. He next was assigned as a B-52 operations planner at Headquarters 7th Air Force, Nakhon Phanom Royal Thai Air Force Base, Thailand, where he was responsible for coordinating all B-52 air strikes in Southeast Asia. After the cease-fire he conducted a series of inspections for the Defense Attache Office in Saigon, Republic of Vietnam, and the Vietnamese air force.

In May 1974 he was assigned to the Concepts Division, Office of the Deputy Chief of Staff for Plans and Operations, Headquarters U.S. Air Force, Washington, D.C. There he developed a number of future planning tools, including Air Force long-range capability objectives, use of simulation in battle-staff training, refinement of net assessment as an aid to decision-making and mission area analysis in budget planning.

Additionally, he helped direct an interagency airborne warning and control system task force, integrating it into U.S. forces and the North Atlantic Treaty Organization community. In March 1978 he returned to operational duties as assistant deputy commander for operations, 28th Bombardment Wing, Ellsworth Air Force Base, South Dakota. He subsequently was appointed deputy commander for operations, then vice commander.

From August 1979 to February 1981 McDonald was commander of the 320th Bombardment Wing, Mather Air Force Base, California. Under his command the wing won the Fairchild Trophy, awarded to the top bomber wing in the Strategic Air Command for combined bombing and navigational excellence. He then transferred to March Air Force Base, California, as commander of the 22nd Bombardment Wing. In July 1982 he became deputy chief of staff for operations, Headquarters 15th Air Force, also at March.

He was vice commander of the Ogden Air Logistics Center, Hill Air Force Base, Utah, from July 1983 to October 1984. He then went to AFLC headquarters as deputy chief of staff for plans and programs, and in December 1985 became chief of staff. In August 1987 he became deputy chief of staff for logistics and engineering at Air Force headquarters. He assumed AFLC command in November 1989.

He was a command pilot with more than 4,600 flying hours. His military awards and decorations include the Distinguished Service Medal, Legion of Merit with oak leaf cluster, Bronze Star Medal, Meritorious Service Medal, Air Medal with oak leaf cluster, Air Force Commendation Medal and Combat Readiness Medal.

He was promoted to general November 1, 1989, with same date of rank, and retired June 30, 1992.

McDonald died on November 22, 2017, in Niceville, Florida. He was interred at Barrancas National Cemetery in Pensacola, Florida.

== Awards and decorations ==
Air Force Command Pilot Badge
Basic Missile Maintenance Badge

Air Force Distinguished Service Medal
Legion of Merit with one oak leaf cluster
Bronze Star Medal
Meritorious Service Medal
Air Medal
Air Force Commendation Medal
Air Force Outstanding Unit Award
Air Force Organizational Excellence Award with oak leaf cluster
Combat Readiness Medal
National Defense Service Medal
Vietnam Service Medal with two bronze service star
Air Force Overseas Short Tour Service Ribbon
Air Force Overseas Long Tour Service Ribbon
Air Force Longevity Service Award with silver and three bronze oak leaf clusters
Small Arms Expert Marksmanship Ribbon
Air Force Training Ribbon
Republic of Vietnam Gallantry Cross
Vietnam Campaign Medal
