= Jonathan J. Smith =

American politician

- Born: January 13, 1844; Harvard, Illinois
- Died: December 19, 1916 (aged 72); Barron, Wisconsin
- Occupations: Newspaper editor, Politician

Jonathan J. Smith (January 13, 1844 – December 19, 1916) was an American businessman, newspaper editor, and politician. He was a member of the Wisconsin State Assembly.

Born in Harvard, McHenry County, Illinois, Smith served in the 65th Illinois Volunteer Infantry Regiment during the American Civil War. He then lived on a farm in Butler County, Iowa. In 1878, Smith moved to Barron, Wisconsin. He was one of the editors of the Barron Republican newspaper and owned a general store. He served as town treasurer, city treasurer, and mayor of Barron, Wisconsin. From 1895 to 1899, Smith served in the Wisconsin State Assembly and was a Republican. Smith died in Barron, Wisconsin.
