= James R. Beckwith =

American politician

James R. Beckwith (July 18, 1857 – April 28, 1935) was an American farmer, politician, and businessman.

Born in Elmira, New York, Beckwith moved with his parents, in 1871, to Columbia County, Wisconsin and then to Barron County, Wisconsin. He settled on a farm in the town of Barron in Barron County. He was also involved with the Beavers' Reserve Fund Fraternity and with the Barron Co-operative Creamery Company. He served on the Barron Town Board and was chairman of the town board. He also served as town treasurer. Beckwith also served on the school board and on the Barron County Board of Supervisors. In 1915, Beckwith served in the Wisconsin State Assembly as a Republican. In 1919, Beckwith sold his farm, retired and moved to Barron, Wisconsin. Beckwith died in a hospital in Rice Lake, Wisconsin after having surgery.
