= Ray R. Clark =

American politician

Ray R. Clark (September 8, 1877 – May 6, 1926) was a mayor of Long Beach, California.

Clark was born on September 8, 1877, in Barron, Wisconsin. Later Clark and his family moved to Iowa, and then settled at San Bernardino, California, in 1884. Clark later moved to Pasadena, California, before settling in Long Beach in 1907. He died of heart disease on May 6, 1926, following an operation on his tonsils.

== Career ==
Clark became a public servant in 1924 and was soon appointed mayor. He served as mayor for two consecutive years until his death.
