= Robert George Johnson =

American lawyer and politician

Robert George Johnson (March 24, 1925 – April 7. 1969) was an American lawyer and politician.

John was born in Minneapolis, Minnesota. He went to the Hector, Minnesota public schools. Johnson served in the United States Navy during World War II and was a pilot. He received his bachelor's and law degrees from University of Minnesota and then practiced law in Willmar, Minnesota. Johnson served on the Willmar School Board. Johnson served in the Minnesota Senate from 1967 until his death in 1969. He died of cancer at his home in Willmar, Minnesota.
