= KRVY-FM =

Radio station in Alexandria, Minnesota

Coordinates: 45.528°N 95.548°W

- Starbuck, Minnesota; United States
- Broadcast area: Alexandria, Minnesota
- Frequency: 97.3 MHz
- Branding: 97.3 The Kangaroo

Programming
- Format: Variety hits

Ownership
- Owner: Iowa City Broadcasting Company, Inc.
- Sister stations: KDJS, KDJS-FM

History
- First air date: 1997 (as KAYF)
- Former call signs: KAYF (1997–2000)
- Call sign meaning: KRVY = RiVer (previous format)

Technical information
- Licensing authority: FCC
- Facility ID: 31059
- Class: C2
- ERP: 50,000 watts
- HAAT: 150 meters

Links
- Public license information: Public file; LMS
- Webcast: Listen Live
- Website: k-musicradio.com

KRVY-FM (97.3 FM, "97-3 The Kangaroo") is a variety hits formatted radio station serving Alexandria, Minnesota.

The station is licensed to the community of Starbuck, Minnesota, and owned Tor Ingstad's Ingstad Media.

On November 1, 2019, KRVY began stunting with Christmas music under the branding "97.3 Happy Holidays." The station previously ran an Adult Contemporary format for many years under the branding "97.3 the River"; this was primarily through the Westwood One Adult Contemporary service, in addition to the morning show.

On December 26, 2019, KRVY flipped to a Variety hits format branded as "97.3 The Kangaroo."
