= Ben Hur Lampman =

American journalist

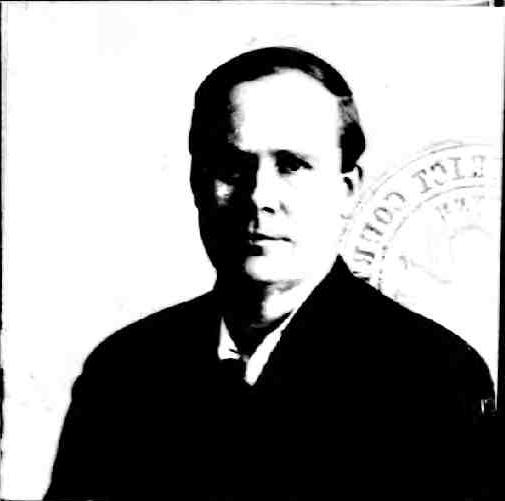
- Born: August 12, 1886; Barron, Wisconsin, U.S.
- Died: January 24, 1954 (aged 67); Portland, Oregon, U.S.
- Occupations: Journalist; essayist; poet

Ben Hur Lampman (August 12, 1886 – January 24, 1954) was an American newspaper editor, essayist, short story writer, and poet. He was a longtime associate editor at The Oregonian in Portland, Oregon, and he served as Poet laureate of Oregon from 1951 until his death.

== Early life ==
Ben Lampman was born on August 12, 1886, in Barron, Wisconsin. His father, H. H. Lampman, owned a newspaper in Barron. The family moved to Neche, North Dakota, when Ben was 4 years old, and his father founded another newspaper in Neche after arriving there. As a boy, he worked in his father's print shop. He left home at age 15 and worked in the wheat country of Canada. He returned to North Dakota. At the age of 19, he married Lena Sheldon (his same age), a New York City resident who had moved to the Dakotas to become a school teacher. They remained married for the remainder of his life. His brother Rex Lampman was a columnist for the Oregon Journal and, later, the Pittsburg Leader.

== Career ==
His first work in newspaper writing took place when he was 19 years old (1905 or 1906), when he and another young man co-founded the Michigan City Arena, a newspaper in Michigan City, North Dakota. He worked on the Arena for seven years, writing editorials and columns and helping to manage the business. In 1912, Lampman moved from North Dakota to Oregon to become manager and publisher of the Gold Hill News, a weekly newspaper in Gold Hill, Oregon. His writing caught the attention of Paul Kelty, then the news editor of Portland's The Oregonian, who recommended Lampman to editor-in-chief Edgar B. Piper. He was hired, moved to Portland, and began working for The Oregonian on February 1, 1916. For his first 14 months at the paper, he covered police-related news, but also wrote editorials from time to time. In 1920, he published an account of the 1919 Centralia Massacre. In additional to part-time editorial writing, he worked as a reporter and feature writer for The Oregonian until 1922, when the paper made him a full-time editorial writer and an associate editor. He also wrote nature essays in The Oregonian.

His stories and essays also appeared in national magazines such as the Saturday Evening Post. Some of his essays about life in Portland were collected in his 1942 book At the End of the Car Line. In 1943 he won an O. Henry Award for his short story "Blinker Was a Good Dog" which originally appeared in the Atlantic Monthly. Some of his papers and manuscripts are now in the collection of the library of the University of Oregon. Others reside at Lewis and Clark College and the Oregon Historical Society. The Lewis and Clark Collection also contains, on loan, from the family of Ben's long-time friend, Elizabeth Salway Ryan, Ben's typewriter, his trademark glasses, a complete set of proofs of all 14 of his books and many more items.

Lampman also wrote a column in The Oregonian entitled "Where to Bury A Dog" which is frequently cited in pet memorials. It was included in How Could I Be Forgetting, a 1926 compilation of the author's essays and poems. In total, he authored six books.

Lampman was still an associate editor at The Oregonian in early 1951, when a stroke took him off the job, eventually leading to retirement. He was named poet laureate of Oregon on February 20, 1951.

In the 1980s, Elizabeth Salway Ryan wrote a biography, The Magic of Ben Hur Lampman. The typescript was published in a very limited edition by Grandson Mark Anders Kronquist and Daughter Sally Ryan Tomlinson. Copies of the first edition typescript are in the collections of the University of Oregon, The Lake Oswego Public Library, the Library of Congress and the Oregon Historical Society. In 2011, as a part of the celebration, Lewis and Clark College printed several hundred copies of the typescript.

== Family ==
As of the 1930 U.S. Census, he and his wife, Lena, had one son and two daughters: Herbert Lampman, Caroline S. Lampman, and Hope H. Lampman. Son Herbert Sheldon Lampman (March 18, 1907 – June 30, 1943), a naturalist, also became a writer and journalist, and was The Oregonian's wildlife editor and one of its feature writers for about 12 years until his death in 1943 at the age of just 36.

== Death ==
Lampman died in Portland on January 24, 1954. He had been in a nursing home for the last two years of his life, following a series of cerebral hemorrhages.
