= Jennie-O =

American brand of turkey products

- Product type: Turkey, ground turkey, turkey burgers, turkey tenderloins
- Current owner: Hormel
- Country: United States
- Introduced: 1940
- Markets: Industry food processing
- Previous owners: Earl B. Olson, founder
- Website: www.jennieo.com

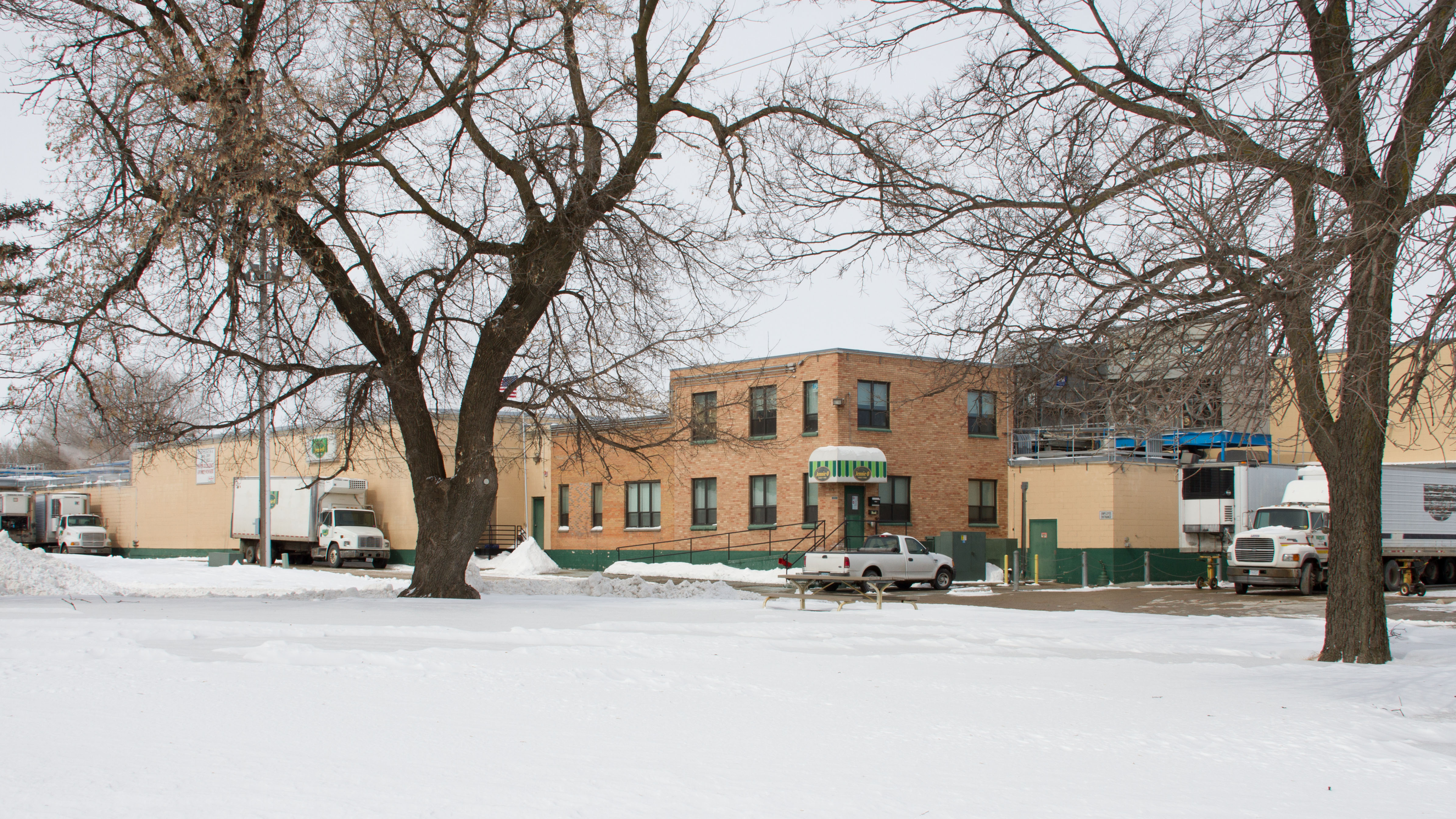
Jennie-O Foods Inc Plant #1, Willmar, Minnesota

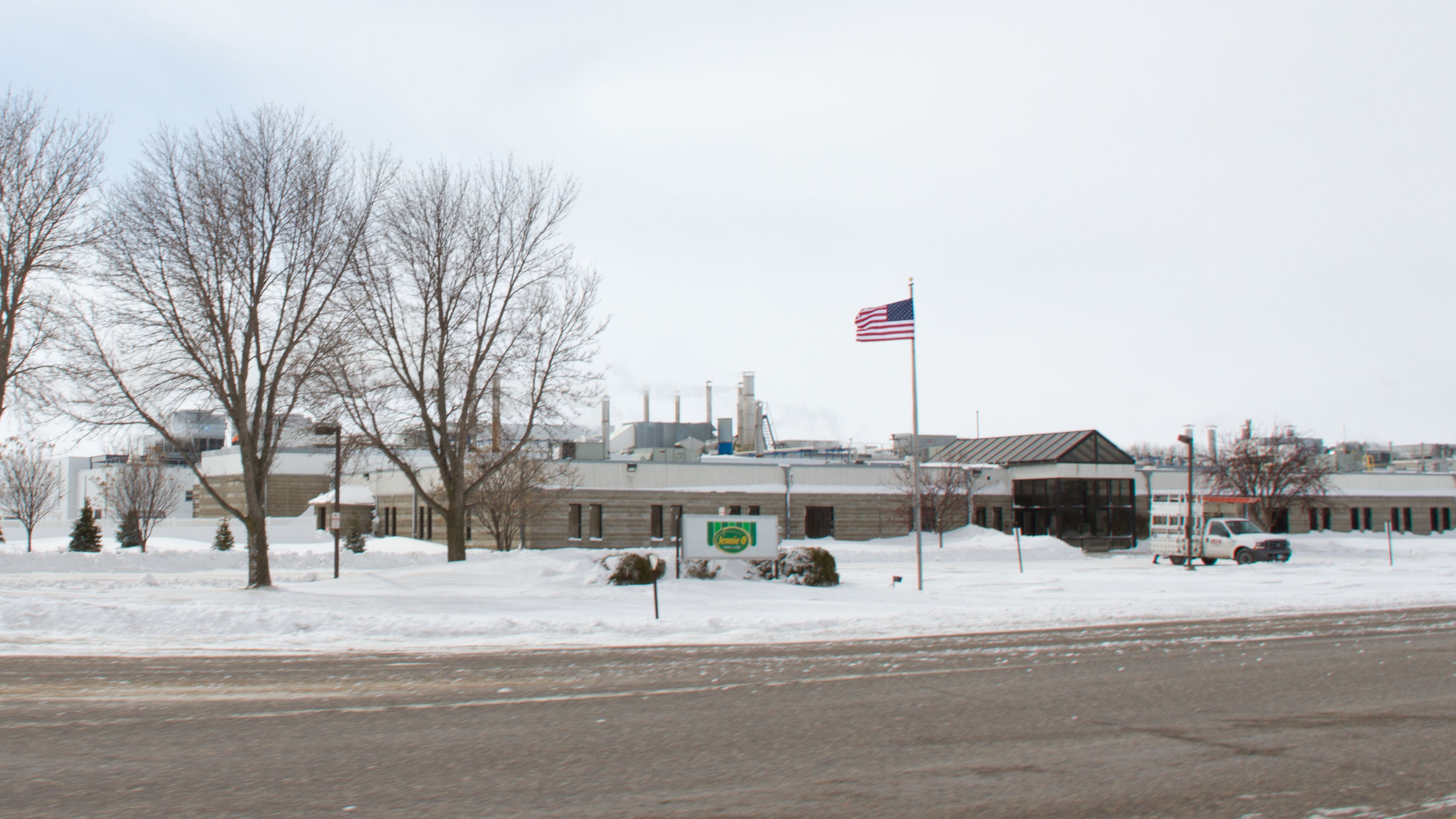
Jennie-O processing plant, Willmar, Minnesota

Jennie-O Turkey Store is a brand name of turkey products. It is a subsidiary of the Hormel Foods Corporation in Willmar, Minnesota.

== History ==
The company was founded by Earl B. Olson in 1940, when he began raising turkeys. In 1949, he bought the former Farmers Produce Company of Willmar and its turkey processing plant. In 1953, it was renamed to Jennie-O after his daughter, Jennifer Olson.

Wallace Jerome also played a role in the formation of the current Jennie-O organization. In 1941, Jerome founded the Turkey Store Company.

The company was privately owned by the Olson family until 1986, when it was sold to Hormel Foods, of Austin, Minnesota. In February 2001, Jennie-O Foods, Inc., and The Turkey Store Company, consolidated under Hormel to create the brand Jennie-O Turkey Store.

== Locations ==
Jennie-O has a total of six company locations, five of which are in Minnesota and one in Wisconsin. The Minnesota locations include Willmar/Spicer, Faribault, Montevideo, Pelican Rapids, and Melrose, along with Barron, Wisconsin.
