= Norman C. Skogstad =

Norman C. Skogstaf
- Born: July 18, 1920; Barron, Wisconsin
- Died: May 12, 2001 (aged 80)
- Military career
- Allegiance: United States
- Branch: United States Army Air Forces
- Service years: 1942–1945
- Rank: Captain
- Unit: 307th Fighter Squadron
- Conflicts: World War II: Mediterranean theater; European theater
- Awards: Silver Star; Distinguished Flying Cross; Purple Heart; Air Medal (18)
- Other work: Lawyer

Norman Cyrus Skogstad (July 18, 1920 – May 12, 2001) was a United States Army Air Forces flying ace and a leading pilot in the Mediterranean Theater of Operations during World War II.

== Early life ==
Norman Cyrus Skogstad was the son of Otis Skogstad (1886–1965) and Mabel (Simonson) Skogstad (1892–1979) of Barron, Wisconsin. He graduated from St. Olaf College in Northfield, Minnesota.

== World War II ==
He served in the Army Air Corps in World War II with the 307th Fighter Squadron. He began his overseas service in June 1944 as a first lieutenant. By the end of the war, he was a captain and the leader of a squadron. As an ace, Skogstad had 12 confirmed kills, piloting a P-51. His first occurred August 7, 1944, in Blechhammer, Poland where he destroyed two enemy aircraft. On August 18, 1944, he destroyed two Messerschmitt Bf 109s over Ploiești, Romania. Ten days later in Austria, he destroyed one transport. On September 2, 1944, he was credited with destroying one Junkers Ju 52. On December 17, 1944, he was credited with destroying two Focke-Wulf Fw 190s over Blechhammer, Poland. His last confirmed kills occurred on March 25, 1945, where he destroyed four Fw 190s over Olomouc, Moravia. From August 12 to 16, 1944, he flew in support of Operation Dragoon, the Allied invasion of southern France.

Norman C. Skogstad was awarded the European–African–Middle Eastern Campaign Medal with seven battle stars, the ATO anti-submarine patrol decoration, the Purple Heart, the Air Medal with 17 clusters, and the Distinguished Flying Cross. He also earned the Presidential Unit and Silver Star for gallantry.

== After the war ==
He was an accomplished trial attorney and practiced law for 35 years. He retired in 1982. His wife, Marilynn Carlson Skogstad (1923–1999), died August 30, 1999. Norman Skogstad died on May 12, 2001, at the age of 80 and was buried in Washington Park East Cememtery, Indianapolis, Indiana. He had five children: Leif, Britt, Sigrid Luther, Ingrid Dinsmore, and Lisa Skogstad.
