= Edward N. and Mary T. Stebbins House =

Historic house in Wisconsin, United States

- U.S. National Register of Historic Places
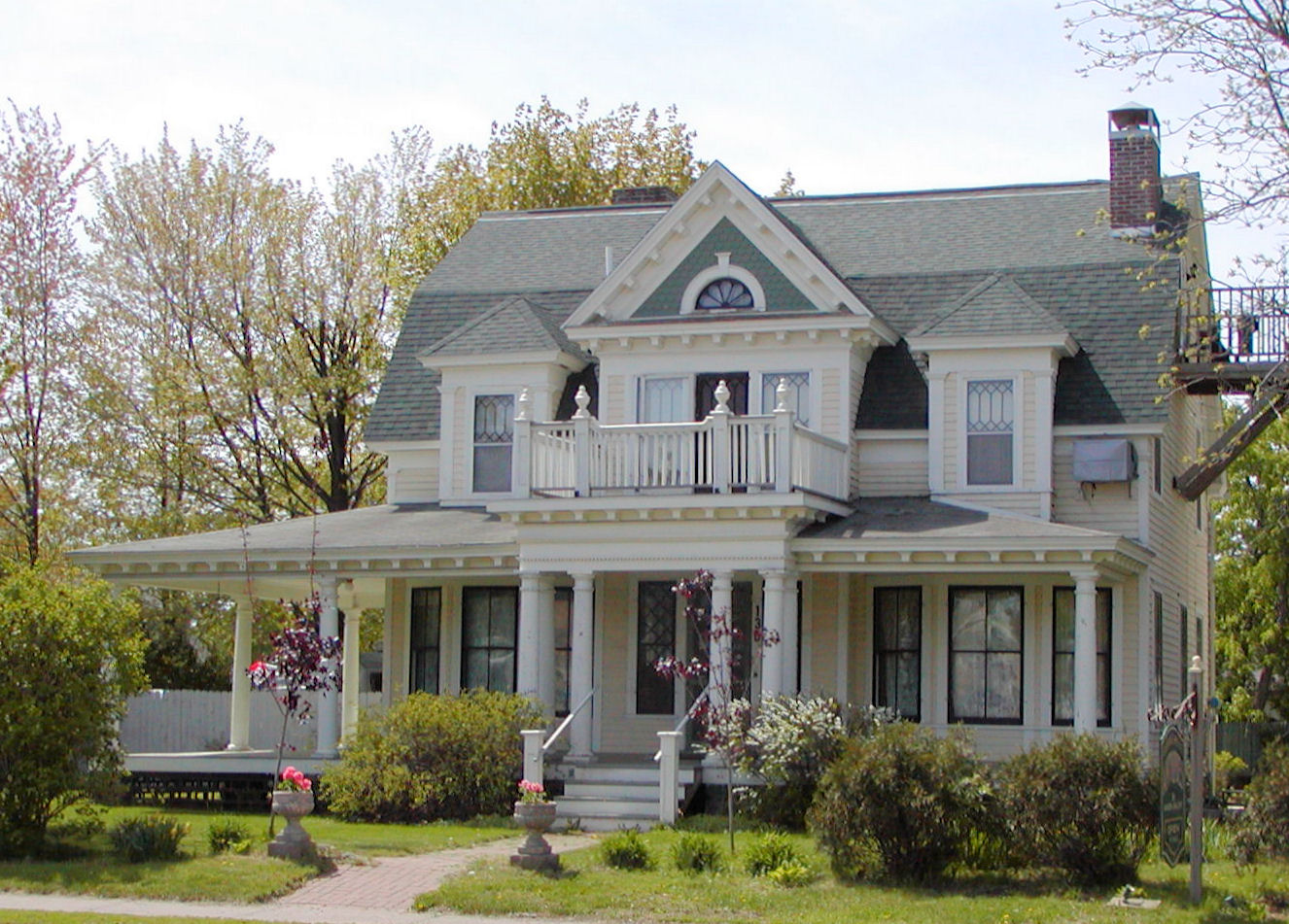
- Edward N. and Mary T. Stebbins House

- Location within Wisconsin Location within the United States
- Interactive map showing the location of Edward N. and Mary T. Stebbins House
- Location: 130 E. Division Ave. Barron, Wisconsin
- Coordinates: 45.40125°N 91.85571°W
- Built: 1897
- Architectural style: Colonial Revival
- NRHP reference No.: 06000945
- Added to NRHP: October 18, 2006

The Edward N. and Mary T. Stebbins House is located in Barron, Wisconsin, United States. It was added to the National Register of Historic Places for its architectural significance in 2006.

== History ==
The house was built by Edward and Mary Stebbins, who moved to Barron in 1891. Edward died in 1903 and his widow sold the house in 1907. It has five bedrooms, a garden house, and a carriage house, and at times was used as a bed and breakfast.
