= Thomas K. Berg =

American lawyer

Thomas K. Berg (born February 10, 1940) was an American lawyer and politician.

Berg was born in Willmar, Kandiyohi County, Minnesota. He received his bachelor's degree from the University of Minnesota and his law degree from the University of Minnesota Law School. Berg served in the United States Navy. Berg lived in Minneapolis, Minnesota with his wife and family and practiced law in Minneapolis. Berg served in the Minnesota House of Representatives from 1971 to 1978 and was a Democrat.
