= Earl B. Olson =

American businessman

- Born: May 8, 1915
- Died: December 11, 2006 (aged 91)

Earl B. Olson (May 8, 1915 – December 11, 2006) was an American businessman who founded the Jennie-O Turkey company (now part of Hormel).

== Early life and family ==
Olson was born on a farm north of Murdock, Minnesota, the son of Olof and Anna (Anderson) Olson. Both his parents were immigrants from Sweden. After eight grades of school in Murdock, Olson enrolled in the West Central School of Agriculture, Morris, MN, (now the University of Minnesota Morris) graduating in 1932.

== Business activities ==
Olson first ran a small creamery in Swift Falls, Minnesota, which processed turkeys on the side. In 1940, Earl Olson began raising turkeys. In 1949 he bought the former Farmers Produce Company of Willmar and its turkey processing plant. By 1953, Mr. Olson converted Farmer's Produce to a USDA-inspected eviscerated turkey plant and developed the brand name Jennie-O—after Earl and Dorothy Olson's daughter, Jennifer, and the 'O' in Olson. He served as president and chief executive officer until 1974, when he became chairman of the board. He was chairman emeritus at the time of his death.

He was a mainstay of the turkey industry, and a pioneer in developing new turkey products and expanding the marketplace.
