= KDJS-FM =

Radio station in Willmar, Minnesota

- Willmar, Minnesota; United States
- Broadcast area: Willmar, Minnesota
- Frequency: 95.3 MHz
- RDS: PI: 18E8; PS/RT: HOT COUNTRY K95.3
- Branding: K-95.3

Programming
- Format: Country music

Ownership
- Owner: Iowa City Broadcasting Inc.
- Sister stations: KDJS, KRVY

History
- First air date: May 17, 1993

Technical information
- Licensing authority: FCC
- Facility ID: 33310
- Class: C2
- ERP: 50,000 watts
- HAAT: 133.0 meters (436.4 ft)
- Transmitter coordinates: 45°1′25″N 95°15′57″W

Links
- Public license information: Public file; LMS
- Webcast: Listen Live
- Website: k-musicradio.com

KDJS-FM (95.3 FM; "Hot Country K-95.3") is a radio station licensed to Willmar, Minnesota, United States. The station is currently owned by Iowa City Broadcasting Company.

== Programming ==
KDJS-FM, known on air as "Hot Country, K95.3", programs a country music radio format carrying "The American Country Countdown with Kix Brooks" as well as the Performance Racing Network's "Zmax Racing Country".
