= Willmar, Minnesota =

City in Minnesota, United States

Willmar
- City
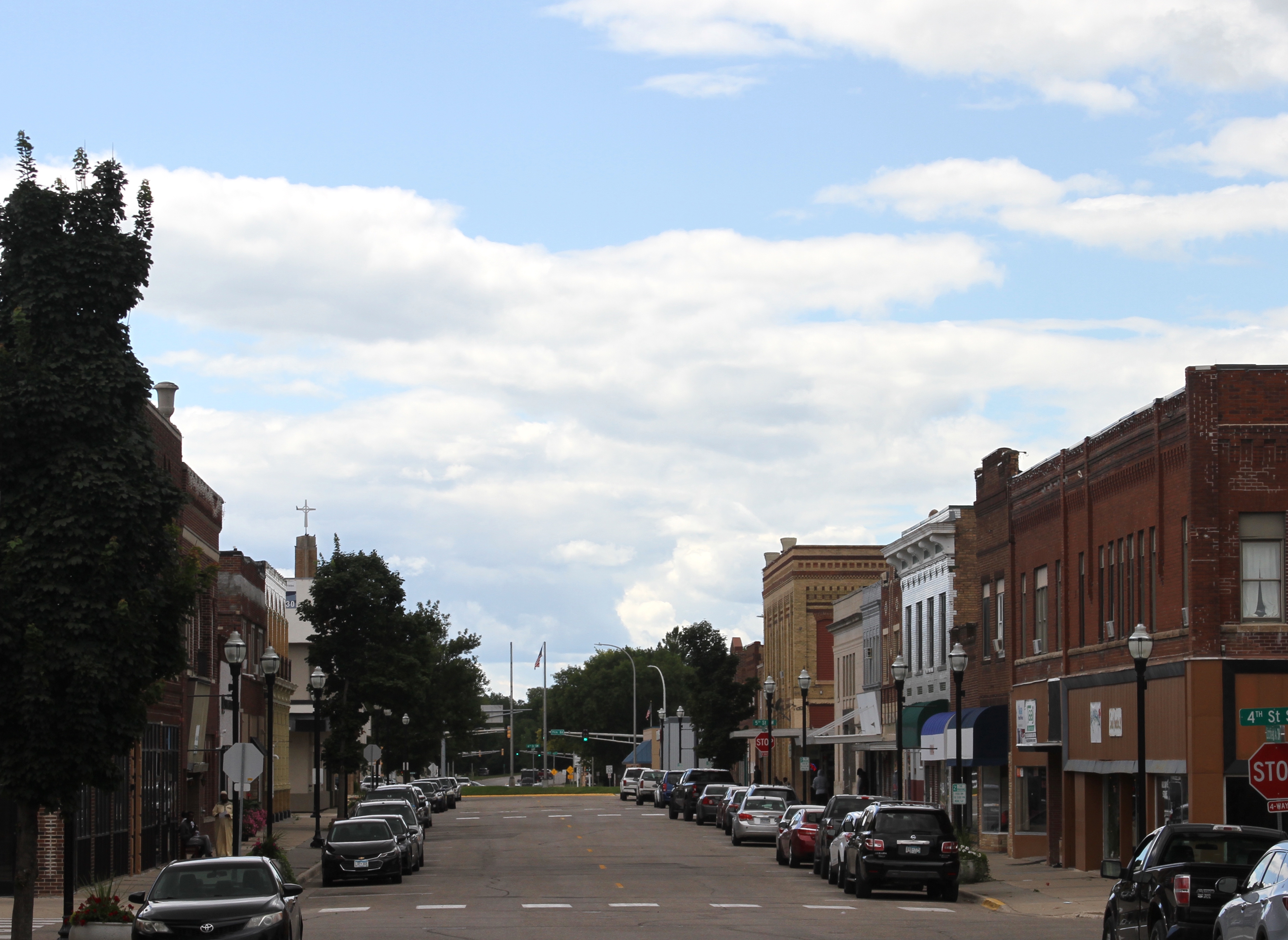
- Litchfield Avenue at 4th Street

- Location of the city of Willmar within Kandiyohi County in the state of Minnesota
- Coordinates: 45°07′18″N 95°03′26″W
- Country: United States
- State: Minnesota
- County: Kandiyohi
- Founded: 1871
- Incorporated (village): 1874
- Incorporated (city): 1901

Government
  - Mayor: Justin Ask

Area
  - Total: 15.58 sq mi (40.35 km^{2})
  - Land: 14.23 sq mi (36.86 km^{2})
  - Water: 1.35 sq mi (3.50 km^{2})
- Elevation: 1,129 ft (344 m)

Population (2020)
  - Total: 21,015
  - Estimate (2022): 21,282
  - Density: 1,476.8/sq mi (570.21/km^{2})
- Time zone: UTC−6 (Central (CST))
  - Summer (DST): UTC−5 (CDT)
- ZIP Code: 56201
- Area code: 320
- FIPS code: 27-70420
- GNIS feature ID: 2397323
- Website: willmarmn.gov

Willmar (/ˈwɪlmər/ WIL-mər) is a city in, and the county seat of, Kandiyohi County, Minnesota, United States. The population was 21,015 at the 2020 census.

== History ==
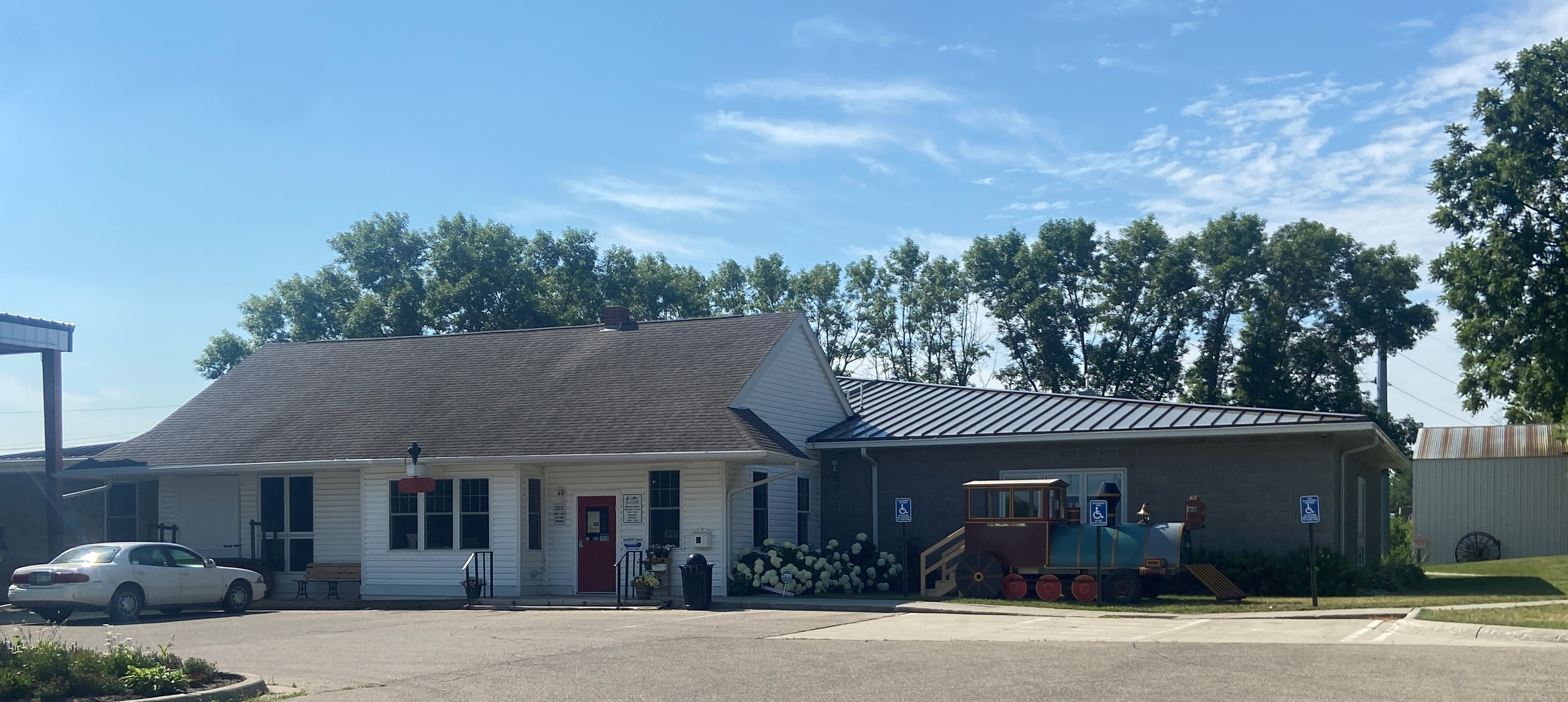
Kandiyohi County Museum

Agricultural expansion and Willmar's establishment as a division point on the Great Northern Railway determined its growth. The first settlers arrived during the 1850s, attracted to the fertile land and abundant timber and game. The Dakota War of 1862 left the township abandoned for several years. The advent of the railroad in Kandiyohi County in 1869 brought new settlers. Many were of Swedish and Norwegian origin; residents of Scandinavian heritage are still a majority. In 1870, Leon (Chadwick) Willmar, a Belgian acting as an agent for the European bondholder of the Saint Paul and Pacific Railroad, bought the title to Section 1 of Willmar Township. Willmar was established as the county seat in 1871 and was incorporated as a village in 1874 and as a city in 1901.

Willmar was the site of a bank robbery by the Machine Gun Kelly gang on July 15, 1930. They robbed the Bank of Willmar (later Otto Bremer Trust) of about $70,000 (equivalent to $1,349,000 in 2025) and wounded three people.

The Willmar Memorial Auditorium, designed by architect William Ingemann, was the largest assembly hall within 70 miles when completed in 1938. It was funded by the city of Willmar and the state and federal governments as a Depression-era works project. It contains several murals by Richard Haines commissioned by the Federal Art Project, and wood paneling in the oak doors by WPA artists. It is on the National Register of Historic Places.

From 1977 to 1979, Willmar was the site of the Willmar 8, a strike of female workers confronting sexual discrimination at a local bank. The strike was reported in mainstream media and a documentary.

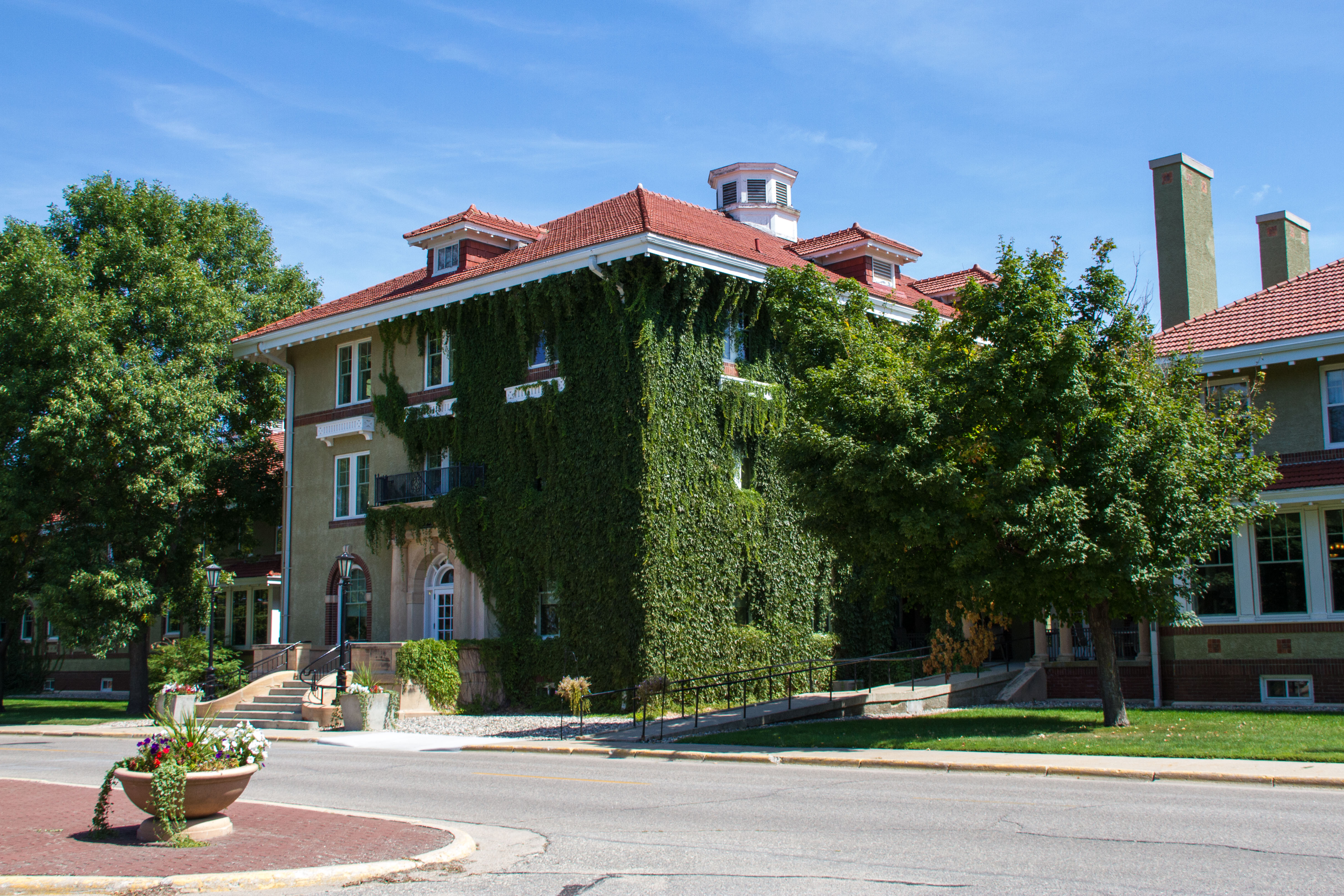
The former state hospital campus is now the MinnWest Technology Campus and is one of several of the city's listings on the National Register of Historic Places.

Bradley Joseph's music draws inspiration from his childhood in Willmar, and his company, Robbins Island Music, is named after a Willmar city park.

Willmar was home to the annual Sonshine Festival, a Christian music festival, from 1982 to 2014.

== Geography ==
According to the United States Census Bureau, the city has an area of 15.95 square miles (41.31 km^{2}), of which 14.15 square miles (36.65 km^{2}) is land and 1.80 square miles (4.66 km^{2}) is water.

The 45° latitude line passes just south of Willmar, placing it approximately halfway between the equator and the North Pole.

=== Climate ===
Climate data for Willmar, Minnesota, 1991–2020 normals, extremes 1893–present
Month	Jan	Feb	Mar	Apr	May	Jun	Jul	Aug	Sep	Oct	Nov	Dec	Year
Record high °F (°C)	62 (17)	62 (17)	79 (26)	94 (34)	105 (41)	103 (39)	107 (42)	105 (41)	105 (41)	91 (33)	80 (27)	64 (18)	107 (42)
Mean maximum °F (°C)	40.5 (4.7)	44.3 (6.8)	61.2 (16.2)	77.7 (25.4)	88.5 (31.4)	91.9 (33.3)	91.8 (33.2)	90.2 (32.3)	87.4 (30.8)	81.5 (27.5)	61.0 (16.1)	44.4 (6.9)	94.7 (34.8)
Mean daily maximum °F (°C)	20.5 (−6.4)	25.7 (−3.5)	38.2 (3.4)	54.0 (12.2)	67.6 (19.8)	77.9 (25.5)	81.5 (27.5)	79.4 (26.3)	72.1 (22.3)	57.4 (14.1)	40.1 (4.5)	26.4 (−3.1)	53.4 (11.9)
Daily mean °F (°C)	11.7 (−11.3)	15.8 (−9.0)	29.1 (−1.6)	43.8 (6.6)	57.4 (14.1)	67.9 (19.9)	71.7 (22.1)	69.1 (20.6)	61.1 (16.2)	46.9 (8.3)	31.8 (−0.1)	18.3 (−7.6)	43.7 (6.5)
Mean daily minimum °F (°C)	2.9 (−16.2)	6.0 (−14.4)	20.1 (−6.6)	33.6 (0.9)	47.1 (8.4)	57.8 (14.3)	61.9 (16.6)	58.9 (14.9)	50.1 (10.1)	36.5 (2.5)	23.5 (−4.7)	10.1 (−12.2)	34.0 (1.1)
Mean minimum °F (°C)	−19.7 (−28.7)	−15.8 (−26.6)	−3.8 (−19.9)	18.9 (−7.3)	32.8 (0.4)	45.0 (7.2)	51.5 (10.8)	47.2 (8.4)	34.2 (1.2)	21.0 (−6.1)	4.2 (−15.4)	−13.1 (−25.1)	−22.3 (−30.2)
Record low °F (°C)	−40 (−40)	−38 (−39)	−31 (−35)	−5 (−21)	19 (−7)	32 (0)	39 (4)	33 (1)	19 (−7)	−1 (−18)	−22 (−30)	−35 (−37)	−40 (−40)
Average precipitation inches (mm)	0.68 (17)	0.67 (17)	1.39 (35)	2.63 (67)	3.33 (85)	4.79 (122)	3.99 (101)	3.89 (99)	2.64 (67)	2.40 (61)	1.42 (36)	0.84 (21)	28.67 (728)
Average snowfall inches (cm)	9.2 (23)	7.8 (20)	6.9 (18)	3.8 (9.7)	0.0 (0.0)	0.0 (0.0)	0.0 (0.0)	0.0 (0.0)	0.0 (0.0)	0.5 (1.3)	7.8 (20)	10.1 (26)	46.1 (118)
Average precipitation days (≥ 0.01 in)	6.0	4.9	6.6	8.4	11.2	12.0	9.6	8.8	8.6	9.2	5.8	6.6	97.7
Average snowy days (≥ 0.1 in)	5.8	4.4	4.1	1.3	0.0	0.0	0.0	0.0	0.0	0.4	3.4	5.7	25.1
Source 1: NOAA
Source 2: NWS/XMACIS2

== Demographics ==
Historical population
Census	Pop.	Note	%±
1880	1,002		—
1890	1,825		82.1%
1900	3,409		86.8%
1910	4,135		21.3%
1920	5,892		42.5%
1930	6,173		4.8%
1940	7,623		23.5%
1950	9,410		23.4%
1960	10,417		10.7%
1970	12,869		23.5%
1980	15,895		23.5%
1990	17,531		10.3%
2000	18,351		4.7%
2010	19,610		6.9%
2020	21,015		7.2%
2022 (est.)	21,282		1.3%
U.S. Decennial Census; 2020 Census

=== 2020 census ===
As of the 2020 census, Willmar had a population of 21,015. The median age was 34.2 years. 27.0% of residents were under the age of 18 and 17.1% of residents were 65 years of age or older. For every 100 females there were 93.7 males, and for every 100 females age 18 and over there were 90.3 males age 18 and over.

99.4% of residents lived in urban areas, while 0.6% lived in rural areas.

There were 7,875 households in Willmar, of which 32.8% had children under the age of 18 living in them. Of all households, 41.4% were married-couple households, 18.7% were households with a male householder and no spouse or partner present, and 32.3% were households with a female householder and no spouse or partner present. About 31.8% of all households were made up of individuals and 13.3% had someone living alone who was 65 years of age or older.

There were 8,425 housing units, of which 6.5% were vacant. The homeowner vacancy rate was 1.3% and the rental vacancy rate was 8.8%.

Racial composition as of the 2020 census
Race	Number	Percent
White	13,865	66.0%
Black or African American	2,537	12.1%
American Indian and Alaska Native	145	0.7%
Asian	501	2.4%
Native Hawaiian and Other Pacific Islander	31	0.1%
Some other race	1,873	8.9%
Two or more races	2,063	9.8%
Hispanic or Latino (of any race)	4,991	23.7%

=== 2010 census ===
As of the census of 2010, there were 19,610 people, 7,677 households, and 4,538 families living in the city. The population density was 1,385.9 inhabitants per square mile (535.1/km^{2}). There were 8,123 housing units at an average density of 574.1 per square mile (221.7/km^{2}). The racial makeup of the city was 86.9% White; 4.8% Black, primarily Somali; 0.5% Native American; 0.6% Asian; 0.1% Pacific Islander; 5.4% from other races; and 1.8% from two or more races. Hispanic or Latino of any race were 20.9% of the population.

There were 7,677 households, of which 30.5% had children under the age of 18 living with them, 42.6% were married couples living together, 12.2% had a female householder with no husband present, 4.3% had a male householder with no wife present, and 40.9% were non-families. 32.4% of all households were made up of individuals, and 12.4% had someone living alone who was 65 years of age or older. The average household size was 2.43 and the average family size was 3.10.

The median age in the city was 33.8 years. 25.2% of residents were under the age of 18; 12.7% were between the ages of 18 and 24; 24.1% were from 25 to 44; 22.2% were from 45 to 64; and 15.8% were 65 years of age or older. The gender makeup of the city was 48.8% male and 51.2% female.

=== 2000 census ===
As of the census of 2000, there were 18,351 people, 7,302 households, and 4,461 families living in the city. The population density was 1,549.9 inhabitants per square mile (598.4/km^{2}). There were 7,789 housing units at an average density of 657.8 per square mile (254.0/km^{2}). The racial makeup of the city was 88.12% White, 0.90% African American, 0.46% Native American, 0.53% Asian, 0.11% Pacific Islander, 8.52% from other races, and 1.36% from two or more races. Hispanic or Latino of any race were 15.86% of the population.

There were 7,302 households, out of which 31.3% had children under the age of 18 living with them, 47.3% were married couples living together, 10.0% had a female householder with no husband present, and 38.9% were non-families. 31.2% of all households were made up of individuals, and 12.7% had someone living alone who was 65 years of age or older. The average household size was 2.44 and the average family size was 3.08.

In the city, the population was spread out, with 26.2% under the age of 18, 12.0% from 18 to 24, 26.4% from 25 to 44, 19.0% from 45 to 64, and 16.4% who were 65 years of age or older. The median age was 34 years. For every 100 females, there were 91.0 males. For every 100 females age 18 and over, there were 86.6 males.

The median income for a household in the city was $33,455, and the median income for a family was $45,415. Males had a median income of $31,575 versus $22,158 for females. The per capita income for the city was $18,515. About 8.4% of families and 13.1% of the population were below the poverty line, including 16.2% of those under the age of 18 and 8.0% of those 65 and older.

=== Immigration ===
Since 1989, Willmar has had a large influx of immigrants from Latin America and Northeast Africa, mostly due to demand for labor at the Jennie-O poultry plant. In 2001, the National Civic League recognized Willmar as an "All America City", in part for its success as growing numbers of immigrants became part of the community.

In 2005, the city received attention from national media after several Somali-American high school students gave Willmar High School its first cross-country state championship in 20 years. The team won the state tournament and attended the Nike Nationals in both 2005 and 2006. The city gained attention from Sports Illustrated, and NBC Nightly News ran a story on Willmar's changing complexion and acceptance of its new citizens.

Willmar received more national attention when an opinion piece about immigration and Willmar by Thomas Friedman appeared in the New York Times on May 14, 2019.

On January 16, 2026, national news outlets—including MS NOW—reported that U.S. Immigration and Customs Enforcement (ICE) agents ate a meal at a Mexican restaurant in Willmar, then returned later in the day to arrest the employees who had provided their meal.

== Education ==
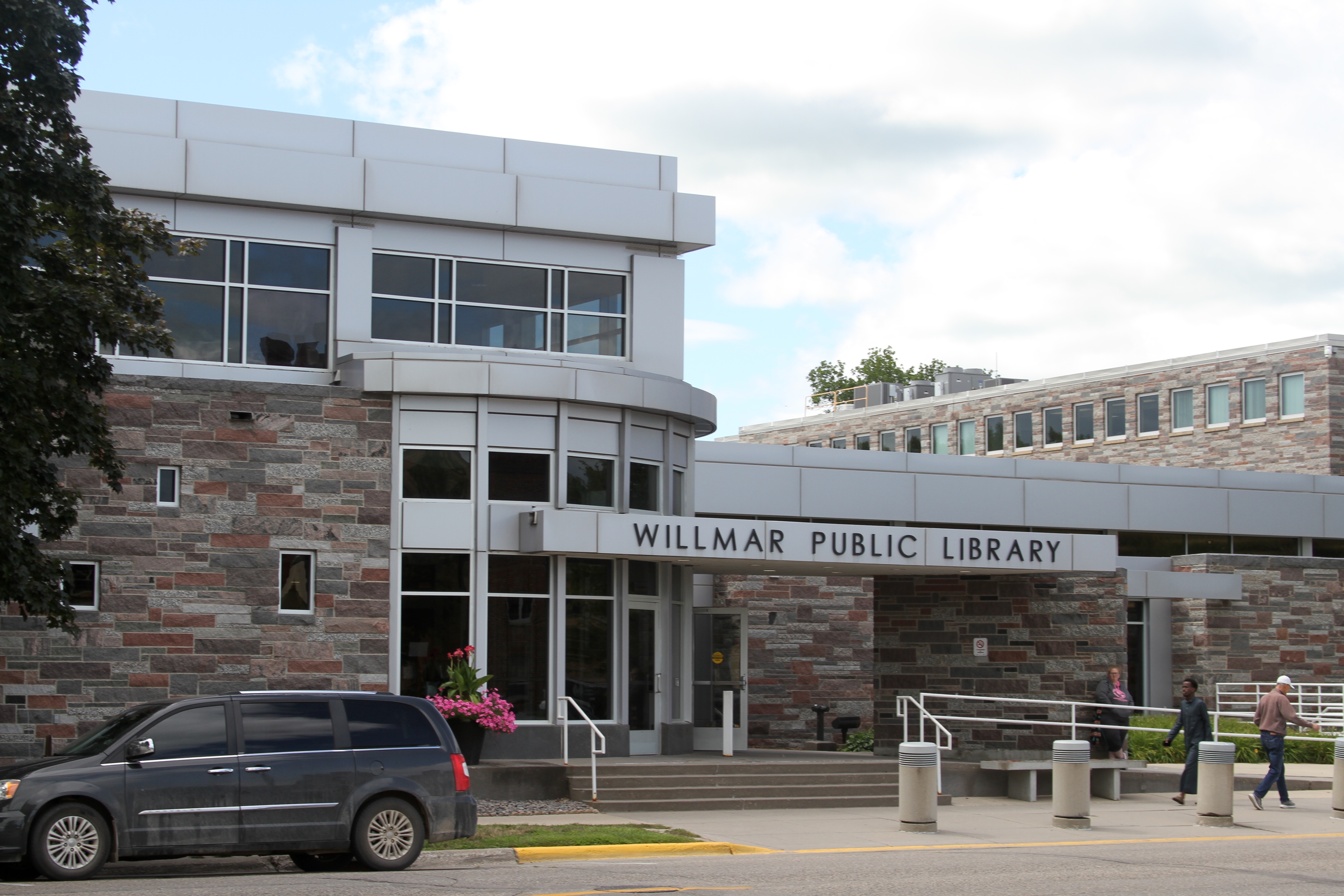
Willmar Public Library

Willmar is home to Ridgewater College, a community and technical college on the site of a former military base. It has a sister college in Hutchinson. Ridgewater enrolls over 5,500 students and provides a moderate range of programs, in addition to providing access to some four-year programs through relationships with universities in the MnSCU system. It is also home to Willmar High School and Willmar Community Christian School.

== Transportation ==
U.S. Highways 12 and 71 and Minnesota State Highways 23 and 40 are four of the main routes in the city.

Willmar greatly benefited from being at the junction of multiple railway lines. From Willmar, the Great Northern Railway had lines radiating east to Minneapolis and St. Paul, northwest to Fargo and Seattle, northeast to St. Cloud and Duluth, and southwest to Sioux Falls and Yankton. Willmar was served by numerous passenger trains over the years. The last passenger train left Willmar station in 1979.

== Sports ==
Team	League	Venue
Willmar Stingers	Northwoods League, Baseball	Bill Taunton Stadium
Willmar WarHawks	NA3HL, Ice Hockey	Willmar Civic Center

== Media ==
=== Newspapers ===
- West Central Tribune
- La Gran America (Trilingual newspaper)

=== Magazines ===
- Seasons of Minnesota

=== Television stations ===
- UHF-TV Inc.

WRAC TV - Regional Access Channel

=== Broadcast ===
Channel	Callsign	Affiliation	Branding	Subchannels		Owner
(Virtual)	Callsign	Affiliation	Branding	Channel	Programming	Owner
4.1	K33OT-D (WCCO Translator)	CBS	WCCO 4	4.2	Start TV	UHF Television, Inc.
9.9	K30FZ-D (KMSP Translator)	FOX	FOX 9	9.4; 9.5; 9.6	Buzzr; Light TV; Decades	UHF Television, Inc.
9.2	K36OL-D (WFTC Translator)	Ind.	FOX 9 Plus	9.3; 9.1	Movies! FOX	UHF Television, Inc.
10.1	K22ND-D (KWCM Translator)	PBS	Pioneer Public TV	10.2; 10.3; 10.4; 10.5	Create; Minnesota Channel; World; PBS Kids	UHF Television, Inc.
11.1	K17FA-D (KARE Translator)	NBC	KARE 11	11.2; 11.3; 11.4	Court TV; True Crime Network; Quest	UHF Television, Inc.
23.1	K14LF-D (WUCW Translator)	CW	CW 23	23.2; 23.3; 23.4	Comet; Charge! TBD	UHF Television, Inc.
28.1	K28IF-D	TBN		28.2; 28.3	Hillsong Channel; JUCE TV	UHF Television, Inc.
34.1	K34HO-D	Reelz		5.4; 5.6; 34.2; 34.3	Antenna TV; This TV; Kool-TV; Retro TV	UHF Television, Inc.
35.1	K35NR-D	Heartland		35.2; 35.3; 35.4	Retro TV; Rev'n; Family	UHF Television, Inc.
41.1	K26NU-D (KPXM Translator)	ION	ION	41.2; 41.3; 41.4; 41.5; 41.6	Qubo; Ion Plus; ION Shop; QVC; HSN	UHF Television, Inc.
42.1	K19IH-D (KSAX Translator)	ABC	5 Eyewitness News	42.2; 42.3	45TV; MeTV	UHF Television, Inc.

=== Pay television services ===
- Charter Communications
- DirecTV
- Dish Network

=== Radio stations ===
AM radio stations
Frequency	Call sign	Name	Format	Owner
1340	KWLM		News/Talk	Lakeland Media, LLC
1590	KDJS		Classic country	Iowa City Broadcasting Company

FM radio stations
Frequency	Call sign	Name	Format	Owner
90.9	KKLW	K-Love	Christian	Educational Media Foundation
91.9	KBHZ	Praise Live	Christian	North Central University
92.7	K224DB (KTIS-FM Translator)	Life 98.5	Contemporary Christian	University of Northwestern - St. Paul
94.1	KKLN	94.1 The Loon	Classic rock	Lakeland Media, LLC
95.3	KDJS	K-95.3	Country	Iowa City Broadcasting, Inc.
96.3	K242CF (KWLM-AM Translator)		News/Talk	Lakeland Media, LLC
100.1	KOLV	Big Country 100.1	Country	Bold Radio, Inc.
102.5	KQIC	Q102	Hot AC	Lakeland Media, LLC
103.3	K277CC (KTIS-AM Translator)	Faith 900	Christian talk and teaching	University of Northwestern - St. Paul
105.7	K289CO (KDJS-AM Translator)		Classic country	Iowa City Broadcasting Company
106.5	KLFN	106.5 The Train	Classic Hits	Lakeland Media, LLC

== Notable people ==
- Thomas K. Berg – politician and lawyer
- Wallace Gustafson – lawyer and politician
- Olof Hanson – architect
- Bonnie Henrickson – head women's college basketball coach at UC Santa Barbara
- Roy C. Jensen – farmer and politician
- Dean Johnson – politician
- Robert George Johnson – politician
- Carl O. Jorgenson – politician
- Bradley Joseph – composer and recording artist
- Pinky Nelson – astronaut
- Alec G. Olson – politician
- Earl B. Olson – founder of the Jennie-O Turkey company
- Kenneth L. Olson – United States Army soldier
- Jim Pederson – professional football player
- Henrik Shipstead – politician
- Curt Swan – illustrator of Superman comics from the 1950s to the 1980s
- Rick Swenson – dog musher and Iditarod participant
- Alan Welle – politician and businessman
- Henry G. Young – lawyer and politician

== Sister city ==
Willmar has one sister city, as designated by Sister Cities International:

- Vileyka, Belarus
