= KDJS (AM) =

Radio station in Willmar, Minnesota

- Willmar, Minnesota; United States
- Broadcast area: Willmar, Minnesota
- Frequency: 1590 kHz
- Branding: Fox Sports Radio 1590/105.7

Programming
- Format: Sports
- Affiliations: Fox Sports Radio

Ownership
- Owner: Iowa City Broadcasting Company, Inc.
- Sister stations: KRVY, KDJS-FM

History
- First air date: March 2, 1981

Technical information
- Licensing authority: FCC
- Facility ID: 33311
- Class: D
- Power: 1,000 watts day 89 watts night
- ERP: 250 watts (K289CO)
- HAAT: 135 metres (443 ft) (105.7 FM)
- Transmitter coordinates: 45°5′6.9″N 95°0′20″W
- Translator: 105.7 K289CO (Willmar)

Links
- Public license information: Public file; LMS
- Webcast: Listen Live
- Website: k-musicradio.com

KDJS (1590 kHz) is an AM radio station licensed to Willmar, Minnesota, United States. The station is currently owned by Iowa City Broadcasting Company, Inc. The station is a verified affiliate of the Treasure Island Baseball Network, broadcasting all Minnesota Twins games. It also serves as the local outlet for the Minnesota Timberwolves (NBA). KDJS carries Minnesota Golden Gophers football and basketball through the Gopher Radio Network. The station provides play-by-play for regional high school teams and is a broadcast partner for the Willmar Stingers, a member of the Northwoods League collegiate summer baseball circuit.

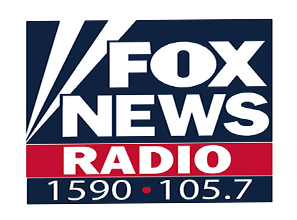
Previous logo

== History ==
KDJS officially signed on the air on March 2, 1981, licensed to Willmar, Minnesota. For much of its early broadcasting history, the station served as a staple for classic country music and local community reporting in West Central Minnesota. The station is currently owned by the Iowa City Broadcasting Company, which operates it as part of a local cluster alongside sister stations KDJS-FM and KRVY-FM. In late 2019, the station underwent a significant rebranding, dropping its long-standing country format to become a conservative talk outlet branded as "Fox News Radio 1590."

As of February 2024, KDJS switched to sports with programming from Fox Sports Radio.

The station signed on FM translator K289CO at 105.7 FM on June 15, 2018.
