= Harry J. Michael =

United States Army Medal of Honor recipient

- Born: March 13, 1922; Milford, Indiana, US
- Died: March 14, 1945 (aged 23) near Neiderzerf, Germany
- Burial place: Violett Cemetery, Goshen, Indiana
- Military career
- Allegiance: United States of America
- Branch: United States Army
- Service years: 1943–1945
- Rank: Second Lieutenant
- Units: 318th Infantry Regiment, 80th Infantry Division
- Conflicts: World War II
- Awards: Medal of Honor

Harry J. Michael (March 13, 1922 – March 14, 1945) was a United States Army officer and a recipient of the United States military's highest decoration—the Medal of Honor—for his actions in World War II.

Michael joined the Army Specialist Training Program from his birthplace of Milford, Indiana in 1943, then completed his education at Purdue University. By March 13, 1945, was serving as a second lieutenant in Company L, 318th Infantry Regiment, 80th Infantry Division. On that day, near Neiderzerf, Germany, Michael single-handedly captured two German machinegun emplacements, reconnoitered the area alone, and led his platoon in two attacks which captured more enemy soldiers and materiel. He was killed while hunting for an enemy sniper the next morning. For his actions, he was posthumously awarded the Medal of Honor a year later on February 13, 1946.

Michael, killed the day after his 23rd birthday, was buried at Violett Cemetery in Goshen, Indiana. The ROTC drill floor at the Purdue University Armory was dedicated to Lt. Michaels in 1995, and his Medal of Honor is on display in the Armory.

== Medal of Honor citation ==
Second Lieutenant Michael's official Medal of Honor citation reads:

He was serving as a rifle platoon leader when his company began an assault on a wooded ridge northeast of the village of Neiderzerf, Germany, early on 13 March 1945. A short distance up the side of the hill, 2d Lt. Michael, at the head of his platoon, heard the click of an enemy machinegun bolt. Quietly halting the company, he silently moved off into the woods and discovered 2 enemy machineguns and crews. Executing a sudden charge, he completely surprised the enemy and captured the guns and crews. At daybreak, enemy voices were heard in the thick woods ahead. Leading his platoon in a flanking movement, they charged the enemy with hand grenades and, after a bitter fight, captured 25 members of an SS mountain division, 3 artillery pieces, and 20 horses. While his company was establishing its position, 2d Lt. Michael made 2 personal reconnaissance missions of the wood on his left flank. On his first mission he killed 2, wounded 4, and captured 6 enemy soldiers single-handedly. On the second mission he captured 7 prisoners. During the afternoon he led his platoon on a frontal assault of a line of enemy pillboxes, successfully capturing the objective, killing 10 and capturing 30 prisoners. The following morning the company was subjected to sniper fire and 2d Lt. Michael, in an attempt to find the hidden sniper, was shot and killed. The inspiring leadership and heroic aggressiveness displayed by 2d Lt. Michael upheld the highest traditions of the military service.

== Awards and decorations ==

Badge	Combat Infantryman Badge		
1st row	Medal of Honor		
2nd row	Bronze Star Medal	Purple Heart	Army Good Conduct Medal
3rd row	American Campaign Medal	European–African–Middle Eastern Campaign Medal with 2 Campaign stars	World War II Victory Medal

== See also ==
- List of Medal of Honor recipients
