= James Beckwith (musician) =

British musician (born 1989)

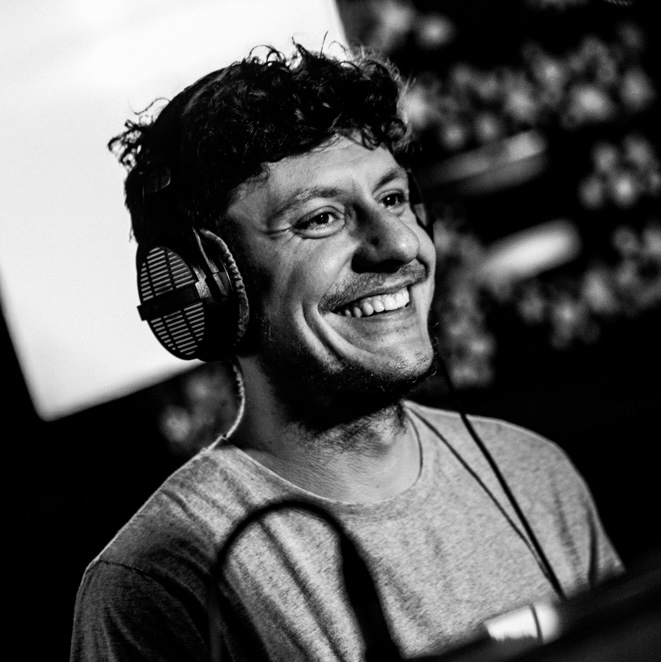

Background information
- Born: September 18, 1989 (age 36); Harlow, Essex, UK
- Origin: London, England
- Genres: Jazz
- Occupations: Musician, composer, piano technician
- Instruments: Piano, keyboards, vocoder
- Website: jamesbeckwith.com

James Robert Beckwith (born September 18, 1989) is a British jazz pianist and composer.

Beckwith was born in Harlow, Essex, and grew up in the market town of Saffron Walden. He attended the Royal Academy of Music Junior Jazz Course in London as a teenager.

Beckwith studied Jazz at Leeds College of Music, winning the John Dankworth Prize for Jazz Composition in his first year of undergraduate studies in 2009.. In 2012 he moved to Canada to study how to be a Piano Technician.. In 2015 he then returned to London and enrolled at Trinity Laban Conservatoire of Music and Dance to undertake an MMus in Composition.

Beckwith has released two studio albums - Long Distance, and SE10. His album SE10 (named after his Greenwich postal code) features Chelsea Carmichael (winner of Breakthrough Act of the Year at Jazz FM Awards), Sheila Maurice-Grey (of Kokoroko and SEED Ensemble), James Copus, Joe Downard and Harry Pope.

Beckwith has headlined shows at Ronnie Scott's Jazz Club and performs regularly in the band of trumpeter Jackson Mathod. He also performs with Daniel Casimir, and Nubya Garcia.

Beckwith is a piano technician having previously worked at Steinway & Sons. He also services electric pianos such as Fender Rhodes, Wurlitzer, Hohner Clavinet, Hohner Pianet and Yamaha CP-70 pianos. Customers have included The Kooks, Hot Chip, Mulatu Astatke, and Joe Armon-Jones. His websites for these disciplines are Greenwich Piano Services and Jupiter Vintage Pianos.

Beckwith is also an avid Arsenal football fan, and is the creator of the website When Is St. Totteringham's Day, a website that tracks the position of St. Totteringham's Day - the day Arsenal are mathematically guaranteed to finish ahead of their North London rivals Tottenham Hotspur.
