= Barron (town), Wisconsin =

Town in Barron County, Wisconsin

Barron, Wisconsin
- Town
- Town of Barron
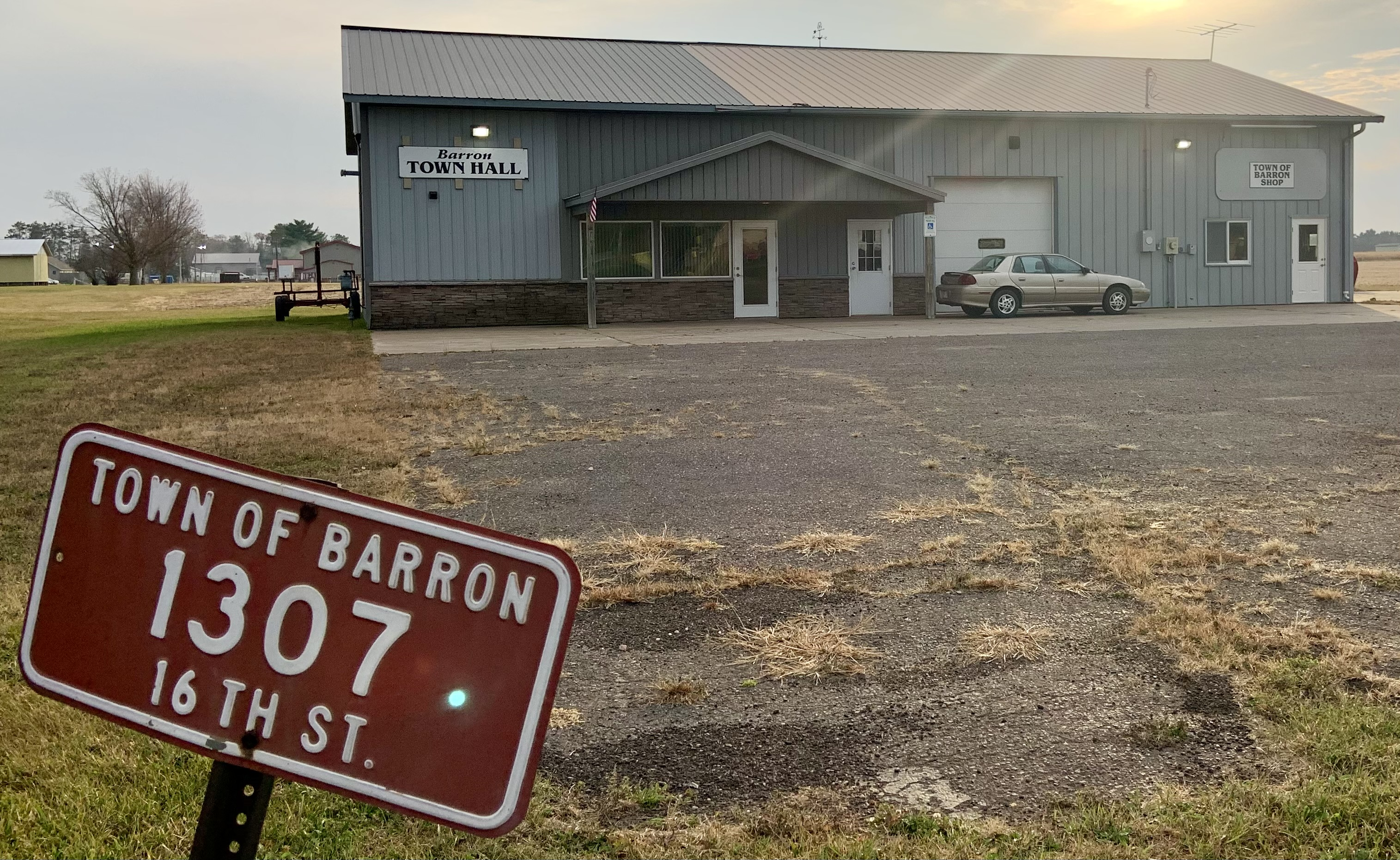
- Barron Town Hall

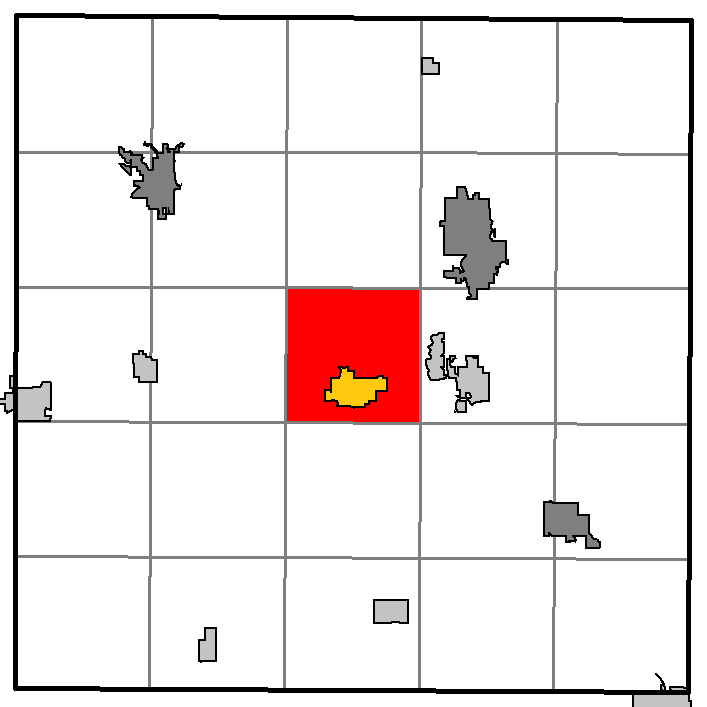
- Location of Barron, within Barron County, Wisconsin

- Location of Barron County, Wisconsin
- Coordinates: 45°26′14″N 91°51′10″W
- Country: United States
- State: Wisconsin
- County: Barron

Area
  - Total: 32.84 sq mi (85.1 km^{2})
  - Land: 32.81 sq mi (85.0 km^{2})
  - Water: 0.03 sq mi (0.078 km^{2})

Population (2020)
  - Total: 813
  - Density: 24.8/sq mi (9.57/km^{2})
- Time zone: UTC-6 (Central (CST))
  - Summer (DST): UTC-5 (CDT)
- ZIP Code: 54812
- Area code(s): 715 & 534
- GNIS feature ID: 1582756
- Website: townofbarron.com

Barron is a town in Barron County in the U.S. state of Wisconsin. The population was 813 at the 2020 census, down from 873 at the 2010 census. The town surrounds the City of Barron.

== Geography ==
Barron is located in the center of Barron County. The Yellow River, a tributary of the Red Cedar River, crosses the town from northwest to southeast, passing through the city of Barron. U.S. Route 8 crosses the town from east to west, leading east 5 miles (8 km) to Cameron and west 14 miles (23 km) to Turtle Lake. Wisconsin Highway 25 crosses the town from north to south.

According to the United States Census Bureau, the town has a total area of 32.9 square miles (85.3 km^{2}), of which 32.9 square miles (85.1 km^{2}) is land and 0.08 square miles (0.2 km^{2}), or 0.2%, is water.

== Demographics ==
As of the census of 2000, there were 1,014 people, 319 households, and 267 families residing in the town. The population density was 30.7 people per square mile (11.9/km^{2}). There were 323 housing units at an average density of 9.8 per square mile (3.8/km^{2}). The racial makeup of the town was 97.93% White, 0.59% Black or African American, 0.1% Asian, 0.59% from other races, and 0.79% from two or more races. Hispanic or Latino people of any race were 0.79% of the population.

There were 319 households, out of which 38.9% had children under the age of 18 living with them, 73.7% were married couples living together, 7.2% had a female householder with no husband present, and 16.3% were non-families. 10.7% of all households were made up of individuals, and 6.9% had someone living alone who was 65 years of age or older. The average household size was 2.98 and the average family size was 3.18.

In the town, the population was spread out, with 27.8% under the age of 18, 7.9% from 18 to 24, 24% from 25 to 44, 25.4% from 45 to 64, and 14.9% who were 65 years of age or older. The median age was 38 years. For every 100 females, there were 97.7 males. For every 100 females age 18 and over, there were 95.2 males.

The median income for a household in the town was $46,500, and the median income for a family was $48,558. Males had a median income of $30,789 versus $20,625 for females. The per capita income for the town was $16,776. About 4% of families and 6.3% of the population were below the poverty line, including 9.5% of those under age 18 and 7.2% of those age 65 or over.
