= Wallace Jerome =

Wallace H. Jerome (22 March 1909 – 21 June 2006) was an American businessman, and the founder of Jerome Foods, later the Turkey Store Company, which was sold to Hormel Foods and merged with Jennie-O Foods, to form what is known today as the Jennie-O Turkey Store company and products. He is considered a pioneer of the domestic turkey industry.

== Early life and education ==
Born in Spooner, Wisconsin, Jerome's family were poor, and he learned to work on the farm at an early age. Due to duties on the farm, he attended school intermittently, graduating from Barron High School in 1928.

He entered the Wisconsin Agricultural Short Course in 1930 in Madison, and began to work for the Wisconsin Department of Agriculture as a poultry and egg inspector. In 1935, he attended the University of Minnesota in St. Paul, where he joined Alpha Gamma Rho fraternity - Lambda chapter. He continued his education at the University of Wisconsin - Madison, receiving a degree in Poultry Husbandry.

== Agricultural career ==
In 1929, Jerome was named the Outstanding 4H Poultry Club Member for Wisconsin. He was honored with a Grand Champion award for his bronze yearling at the 1933 All-American Turkey Show in Grand Forks, North Dakota. He received an Honorary State Farmer Award from the Wisconsin Vocational Agriculture FFA Program in 1973.

Jerome received the Distinguished Service Award from the College of Agriculture and Life Sciences at the University of Wisconsin–Madison, and a Distinguished Agriculturist Award from UW–River Falls in 1976. He retired in 1980 from his company when his son took over as chairman of the board, but remained involved in the turkey industry. He also remained an active member of the FFA Alumni Association and Alpha Gamma Rho Alumni Association.

Alpha Gamma Rho Fraternity awarded him Man of the Year in 1988. In 1992, he was inducted into the American Poultry Historical Society Hall of Fame, and Wisconsin Meat Industry Hall of Fame in 1996. Jerome was honored with a National Turkey Federation Lifetime Achievement Award in 1998. He also received a patent for a Poultry Coop Unloader on May 20, 2003.

== Personal life ==
Jerome married Marion Estenson, a teacher, in 1943.

Jerome created the Wallace H. Jerome Foundation in 1964. Along with his wife, he donated land and financial support to help with numerous community projects in the Barron, Wisconsin area. After Marion's death in 1988, Jerome put up $1,000,000 and asked the community to raise money to match that number to build the Barron Area Community Center in 1989. The Foundation has donated over $4.7 million since its inception.
