= KKLN =

Coordinates: 45.073°N 94.756°W

- Atwater, Minnesota; United States
- Broadcast area: Willmar, Minnesota
- Frequency: 94.1 MHz
- Branding: 94.1 The Loon

Programming
- Format: Classic Rock
- Affiliations: United Stations Radio Networks; Westwood One

Ownership
- Owner: Lakeland Media, LLC

History
- First air date: 1989 (as KYRS)
- Former call signs: KYRS (1988–1999)
- Call sign meaning: KK The LooN

Technical information
- Licensing authority: FCC
- Facility ID: 19243
- Class: A
- ERP: 6,000 watts
- HAAT: 100 meters

Links
- Public license information: Public file; LMS
- Webcast: Listen Live
- Website: 941theloon.com

KKLN (94.1 FM, "94.1 The Loon") is a classic rock format radio station in Willmar, Minnesota, which was previously broadcasting from the Kandi Mall. The station is owned by Lakeland Media, LLC.

== History ==
The station now known as KKLN was operating by 1989 as KYRS, a country station on 94.1 MHz licensed to Atwater, Minnesota. FMedia! listed KYRS that year as a stereo country outlet identifying with Litchfield, and a 1990 listing described the station as having studios in Litchfield. In September 1989, Broadcasting reported that Crow River Broadcasting Inc. had sold KYRS to KYRS Inc. for $282,000.

The station changed hands several times in the 1990s. In 1994, The M Street Journal reported a proposed assignment of KYRS from KYRS FM, Inc. to Elite Broadcasting, Inc. Two years later, Broadcasting & Cable reported that Elite was selling KYRS to StarCom Inc. of Waite Park for $453,159; the report described the station as a country outlet with 3,000 watts on 94.1 MHz.

KYRS became KKLN in June 1999. Northpine reported shortly after the call-letter change that the station was using the name "Classic Country 94.1" and mixing newer and older country titles. By July 1999, however, FMedia! reported that KKLN had become "The New Loon", using a classic and new rock format similar to KLZZ in Waite Park–St. Cloud.

In 2000, Radio Business Report reported the sale of KKLN from KYRS FM Inc., headed by Dennis Carpenter, to Flagship Broadcasting LLC, headed by Richard Anderson and Anita Kimmes. The transaction was valued at $500,000, and the buyer had been operating the station under a local marketing agreement since July 1, 1999. By 2000, technical listings showed KKLN operating with 6,000 watts at 100 meters height above average terrain.

Flagship Broadcasting sold KKLN to Headwaters Media, LLC, in 2009. Radio Business Report reported the transaction at $400,000, with $300,000 due in cash at closing and a $100,000 note. The Federal Communications Commission accepted the assignment application for filing in September 2009 and granted it on November 3, 2009.

In 2025, Headwaters Media filed to assign KKLN, along with KSCR-FM, KBMO, and FM translator K278CX, to Lakeland Media LLC. Northpine reported that the deal added KKLN to Lakeland Media's existing Willmar-area group. Lakeland's station profile describes KKLN as a classic rock station featuring music from the 1960s through the 1990s, with local news, weather, and community-calendar announcements.

== Programming ==
Notable weekday programming includes Loon Mornings, afternoons with Rob Ryan, and Steve Gorman Rocks.
