= Lillian (given name) =

Lillian / Lilian
- Gender: Female
- Language: Latin
- Name day: July 27

Origin
- Meaning: Lilium/Lilies

Other names
- Nicknames: Lilly, Lily, Lil
- Related names: Lilliana, Lilian, Lilianne, Liliane, Lillian

Lillian, also spelled Lilian, Lilliann, or Lilliane, is a female given name. Its origin is the Latin word Lilium (lily).

In French, Lilian (French pronunciation: [li.ljɑ̃]) is the male form of the name, while Liliane is the female form. The first time this name became popular was in the early 1700s, with the expansion of the French colonial empire around the world.

== People ==
- Princess Lilian of Belgium (1916–2002), wife of King Leopold III of Belgium
- Princess Lilian, Duchess of Halland (1915–2013), wife of Prince Bertil, Duke of Halland of Sweden
- Lillian Aber, Ugandan politician
- Lillian Albertson (1881–1962), American actress and theatrical producer
- Lillian B. Allen (1904–1994), Canadian painter
- Lillian Allen (born 1951), Canadian dub poet, musician, and writer
- Lillian Alling (1896–after 1929), American woman who attempted to return to Eastern Europe on foot
- Lillian Bassman (1917–2012), American photographer and painter
- Lilian Bennett (1922–2013), British businesswoman
- Lillian Bilocca (1929–1988), British fisheries worker and campaigner
- Lillian Boutté (1949–2025), American jazz singer
- Lillian Boyer (1901–1989), American wing walker
- Lillian Briggs (1932–1998), American performer and musician
- Lillian Bronson (1902–1995), American actress
- Lillian Cahn (1923–2013), American fashion designer
- Lilian Calmejane (born 1992), French cyclist
- Lillian Gordy Carter (1898–1983), American nurse and mother of Jimmy Carter
- Lillian Chrystall (1926–2022), New Zealand architect
- Lillian Cohen (1878–1949), American chemist and professor
- Lilian Constantini (1902–1982), French actress
- Lillian Copeland (1904–1964), American athlete
- Lillian Crombie (1958–2024), Australian actress and dancer
- Lillian Day (1893–1991), American novelist and playwright
- Lillian Dickson (1901–1983), American missionary
- Lilian Dikmans (born 1985), Australian model and Muay Thai fighter
- Lillian Disney (1899–1997), widow of Walt Disney
- Lillian Dube (born 1945), South African actress
- Lillian Dyck (born 1945), Canadian politician
- Lilian Edirisinghe (1922–1993), Sri Lankan Sinhala actress
- Lillian Elidah, Zambian chef
- Lillian Evanti (1890–1967), American opera singer
- Lillian Faderman (born 1940), American historian
- Lillian Florsheim (1896–1988), American sculptor
- Lilian Fowler (1886–1954), Australian politician
- Lillian Frank (1930–2022), Australian hairdresser
- Lillian Freehof (1906–2004), American writer
- Lillian Frink (1882–1974), American politician
- Lillian Fuchs (1901–1995), American violist and composer
- Lilian Garcia (born 1966), American singer and ring announcer
- Lillian Garrett-Groag, Argentine playwright, theatre director and actor
- Lillian Gilkes, American author and educator
- Lillian Gish (1893–1993), American actress
- Lillian Glass, American writer and activist
- Lillian Greene-Chamberlain (born 1941), American sprinter
- Lilian Greenwood (born 1966), British politician
- Lillian Greneker (1895–1990), American businesswoman, inventor, and mannequin designer
- Lilian Greuze (1890–1950), French model
- Lilian Helder (born 1973), Dutch politician
- Lillian Hellman (1905–1984), American playwright
- Lillian Herlein (1895–1971), American actress and singer
- Lillian Hoban (1925–1998), American author
- Lillian Hoddeson (born 1940), American historian
- Lillian Holley (1890–1994), American sheriff
- Lillian Hurst (born 1943), Puerto Rican actress and comedian
- Lillian Jones, Scottish politician
- Lillian G. Kohlhamer, American suffragist and peace activist
- Lilian Laslandes (born 1971), French footballer
- Lillian Lawrence (1868–1926), American actress
- Lillian Leach (1936–2013), American singer
- Lillian Lehman (born 1947), American actress
- Lilian Leland (1857–1934) American writer and traveler
- Lillian Leitzel (1892–1931), German-American acrobat and entertainer
- Lilian Lee (born 1959), Chinese author
- Lilian Mercedes Letona (1954–1983), Salvadoran guerrilla and revolutionary
- Lillian Lewis, multiple people
- Lilian Leveridge (1879–1953), British-Canadian teacher and writer
- Lillian Li, Chinese-American author
- Lillian Lorraine (c.1893–1955), American film actress
- Lillian Lutuhezi, Namibian politician
- Lilian Managa, South African politician
- Lillian Metge née Grubb (1871–1954), Anglo-Irish suffragette and women's rights campaigner
- Lillian Michelson (born 1928), American film scholar and researcher
- Lillian Miles (1907–1972), American actress
- Lillian Molieri (1925–1980), Nicaraguan actress and dancer
- Lillian Moller Gilbreth (1878–1972), American psychologist and industrial engineer
- Lilian Moore (1909–2004), American author of children's books, teacher and poet
- Lillian Morrison (1917–2014), American poet
- Lillian Mosseller (1915–2012), American visual artist and rug maker
- Lillian Müller (born 1951), Norwegian model and actress
- Lillian Mary Nabulime (born 1963), Ugandan born sculptor and lecturer
- Lillian Nakate (born 1978), Ugandan civil engineer and politician
- Lilian Ngoyi (1911–1980), South African anti-apartheid activist
- Lillian Nordica (1857–1914), American operatic soprano
- Lillian O'Donnell (1926–2005), American writer
- Lillian Offitt (1938–2020), American singer
- Lillian Orlowsky (1914–2004), American artist
- Lillian Palmer (disambiguation), multiple people
- Lillian Hoxie Picken (1852–1913), American educator and textbook compiler
- Lillian Powell (1896–1992), American actress
- Lilian Prunet (born 1978), French ice hockey player
- Lillian Pulitzer Rousseau (1931–2013), American fashion designer
- Lillian Randolph (1898–1980), American actress and singer
- Lillian Rich (1900–1954), English actress
- Lillian Richard (1891–1956), African-American actress
- Lillian Roberts (born 1928), American activist
- Lillian Robinson (1941–2006), American Marxist feminist activist, writer, and theorist
- Lillian Doucet-Roche (1994-Present), Canadian Actress
- Lilian Rolfe (1914–1945), Allied secret agent in World War II
- Lillian Ross (born c. 1944), Canadian politician
- Lillian Ross (1918–2017), American journalist and writer
- Lillian Roth (1910–1980), American actress and singer
- Lillian Roxon (1932–1973), Australian music journalist
- Lillian Schwartz (1927–2024), American artist
- Lillian Shirt (1940–2017), Cree activist
- Lilian Siyoi, Kenyan politician
- Lillian Smith, multiple people
  - Lillian Smith (1897–1966), American author
- Lillian Carpenter Streeter (1854–1935), American social reformer, clubwoman, author
- Lilian Thuram (born 1972), French footballer
- Lillian Too, Malaysian author, television personality and feng shui practitioner
- Lillian Trasher (1887–1961), American Christian missionary
- Lilian Uchtenhagen (1928–2016), Swiss economist and politician
- Lillian Vickers-Smith (1896–1971), Florida sports editor
- Lilian Virgin (born 1939), Swedish politician
- Ella Lillian Wall Van Leer (1892–1986), American artist, architect, and women's rights activist
- Lillian Wald (1867–1940), American nurse, humanitarian activist, and author
- Lillian Walker (1887–1975), American actress
- Lilian Wells (1911–2001), Australian Congregational and Uniting Church of Australia church leader
- Lillian West (1886–1970), American actress
- Lillian Wheeler (1880–1905), Australian actress
- Lillian Worth (1884–1952), American actress
- Lillian Yarbo (1905–1996), American actress, dancer and singer
- Lillian Zabar (c.1905–1995), American entrepreneur
- Lillian Zinkant, Irish camogie player

== Fictional characters ==
- Lilian, the secondary protagonist from the 2023 concept album Anno 1696 by Finnish melodic death metal band Insomnium
- Lillian, a character in the American sitcom television series Charles in Charge
- Lilian, the English name of Yuriko from the 2004 animated series Futari wa Pretty Cure
- Cure Lillian, a main character in the series Wonderful PreCure!
- Lillian DeVille, from the Nickelodeon TV series Rugrats and All Grown Up!
- Lillian Kaushtupper, landlady of Kimmy and Titus in the Netflix original series Unbreakable Kimmy Schmidt
- Queen Lillian, mother of Fiona in the Shrek movie series
- Lillian Rearden, character in the book Atlas Shrugged
- Lilly Truscott, from the Hannah Montana TV series
- Lillian van der Woodsen, mother of Serena van der Woodsen in the Gossip Girl TV series
- Lillian Garner, character in the book Beloved
- Lilian Peck, character from the lore of the game Apex Legends

== See also ==
- Lilyan (disambiguation)
- Lily (name)
