= Lillian =

Lillian or Lilian can refer to:

== People and fictional characters ==
- Lillian (given name) or Lilian, including a list of people and fictional characters with the given name
- Isidore Lillian (1882–1960), American Yiddish theatre playwright and lyricist

== Places ==
=== Iran ===
- Lilian, Iran, a village in Markazi Province

=== United States ===
- Lillian, Alabama
- Lillian, West Virginia
- Lillian Township, Custer County, Nebraska

== Arts and entertainment ==
- Lillian (album), a 2005 collaboration between Alias (Brendan Whitney) and his brother Ehren Whitney
- "John the Revelator / Lilian", a 2006 single by Depeche Mode
- "Lilian", a song by Insomnium from Anno 1696, 2023
- Lillian (film), a 2019 film

== Ships ==
- USS Lillian II (SP-38), a United States Navy patrol boat in commission in 1917
- USS Lilian (1863), a United States Navy steamer in commission from 1864 to 1865

== Other uses ==
- Hurricane Lillian, two tropical cyclones

== See also ==
- Lake Lillian (disambiguation)
