= Wang King-ho =

Taiwanese physician (1916–2014)

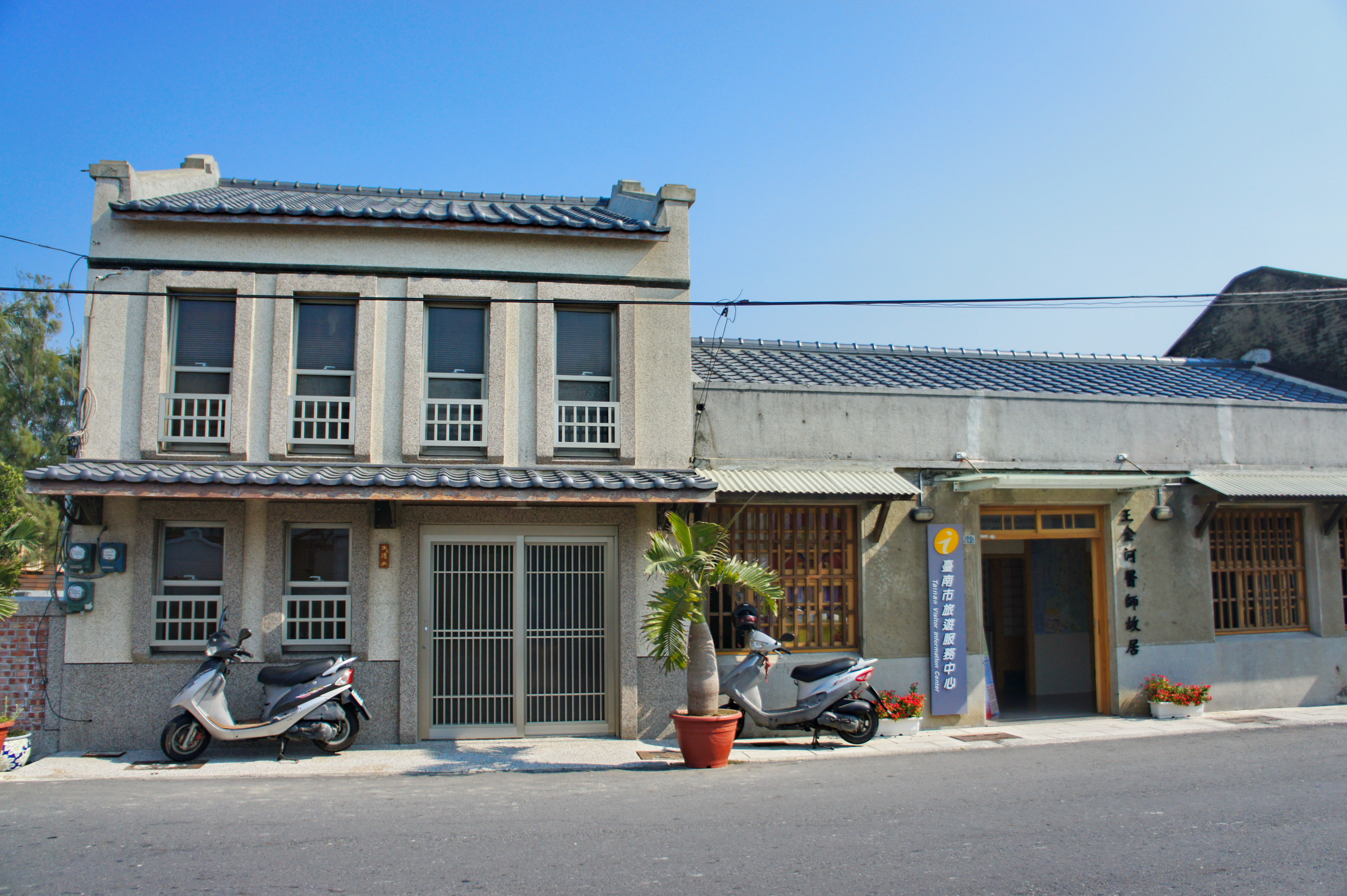
Wang's former residence in Beimen

Wang King-ho (Chinese: 王金河; 23 April 1916 – 13 March 2014) was a Taiwanese physician. He held local political office from 1945 to 1955, and treated residents of Beimen District and surrounding areas after an outbreak of blackfoot disease (arsenic poisoning) in the 1950s.

== Education ==
Wang was born in Tainan Prefecture in 1916 and attended primary and secondary school in Tainan. He graduated from the Medical School of Tokyo in 1941.

== Career ==
He returned to Taiwan in 1943, where he found work with the Provincial Tainan Hospital after two years at Ohkubo Hospital in Tokyo. Wang opened his own practice in 1945. That same year, he was elected leader of Beimen township and later served two terms on the Tainan County Council. In the midst of that second term, Wang was imprisoned for 23 days due to disagreeing with rival council members on certain matters. He stepped down as councilor in 1955, frustrated with government politics.

An outbreak of blackfoot disease began in Beimen in 1956, and Wang partnered with medical professionals at National Taiwan University to research the disease. Missionary Lillian Dickson moved to Beimen in 1960 and opened the Mercy’s Door Free Clinic, which was funded by her organization Mustard Seed International, with Wang as head physician. In 1963, Wang founded a center, where patients made and sold handicrafts to support themselves economically. Hsieh Wei, a doctor based in Puli, Nantou, would make weekly round trips to perform amputations on patients at Mercy's Door until his death in 1970. After Mercy's Door closed in 1984, Wang returned to his own clinic before retiring in 1996.

== Later life and legacy ==
Chen Shui-bian awarded Wang an Order of Brilliant Star, third class in 2007. A Memoir: Father of the Blackfoot Disease, Wang King-ho was published in 2009. The city of Tainan commissioned a statue of Wang in 2013, and placed it at the Taiwan Blackfoot Disease Socio-Medical Service Memorial House, the site of his former clinic. He died in 2014, aged 97.

Wang was married to Mao Pi-mei (毛碧梅), a nurse, from 1942 to her death in 1995.
