= Lake Lillian =

Lake Lillian is the name of several places in the United States:

Lakes

- Lake Lillian (Florida), in Highlands County
- Lake Lillian (Kandiyohi County, Minnesota)
- Lake Lillian (Washington), in the Alpine Lakes Wilderness

Cities and townships

- Lake Lillian, Minnesota, a small city in Kandiyohi County
- Lake Lillian Township, Kandiyohi County, Minnesota
