= Liliam =

Liliam is a given name. Notable people with the given name include:

- Liliam Cuenca (born 1944), Cuban artist
- Liliam Kechichián (born 1952), Uruguayan politician

== See also ==
- Liliane, another given name
