= Beimen Island Presbyterian Church =

Church in Beimen, Tainan, Taiwan

- 北門嶼基督教堂
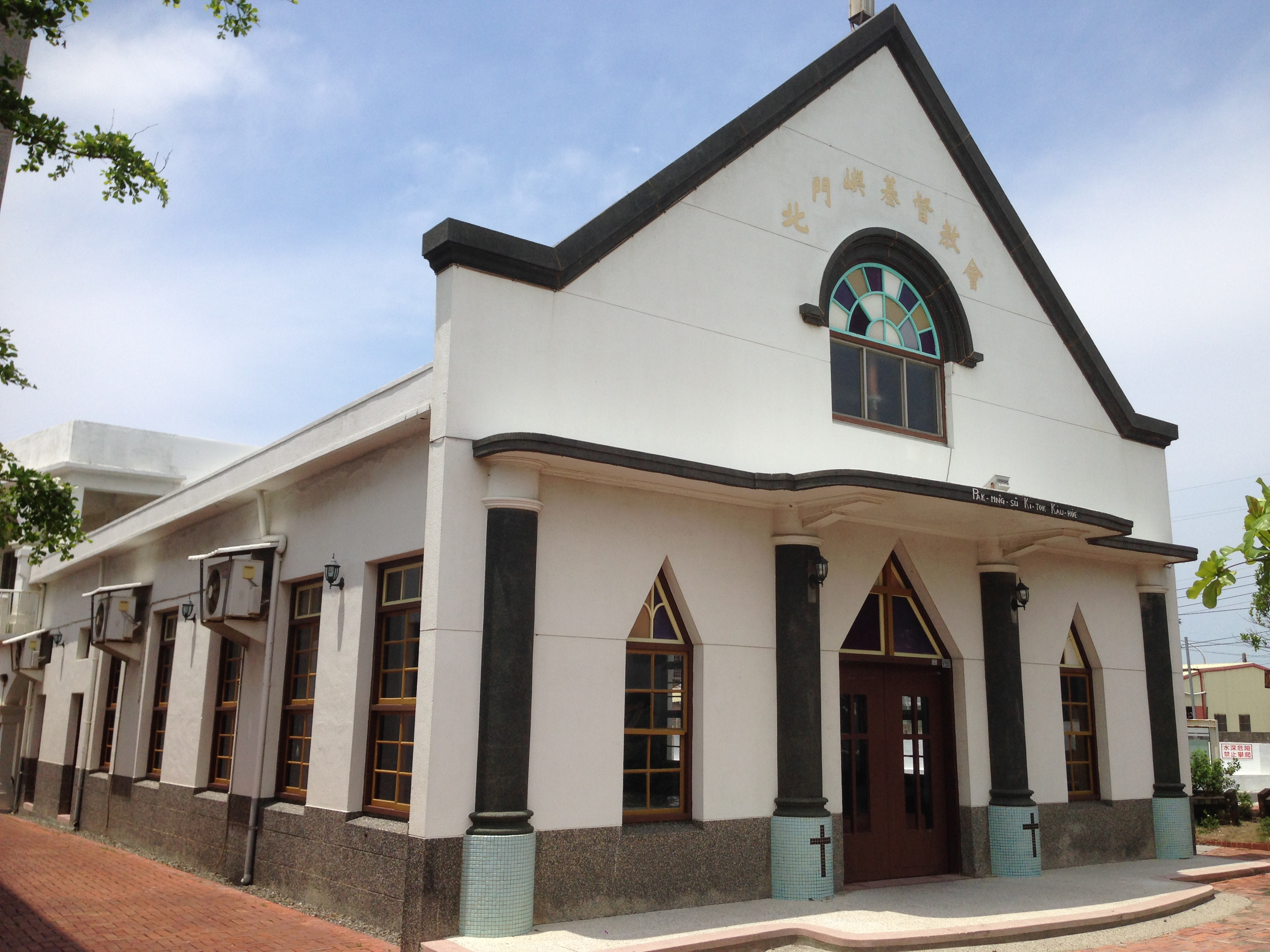
- Beimen Island Presbyterian Church
- 23°16′N 120°07′E
- Location: Beimen, Tainan, Taiwan

Architecture
- Architectural type: church
- Years built: September 1959

The Beimen Island Presbyterian Church (traditional Chinese: 北門嶼基督教堂; simplified Chinese: 北门屿基督教堂; pinyin: Běimén Yǔ Jīdū Jiàotáng) is a church in Beimen District, Tainan, Taiwan.

== History ==
The church was originally established in September 1959 as part of the Beimen Mission. In May 1960, the church began accepting blackfoot disease patients. They distributed free clothing and groceries.

== See also ==
- Christianity in Taiwan
- Taiwan Blackfoot Disease Socio-Medical Service Memorial House
