= Chi Oang =

- 姬望
- Born: April 30, 1872
- Died: April 19, 1946 (aged 73)

Chi Oang (April 30, 1872 – April 19, 1946) was a Taiwanese indigenous Presbyterian missionary. She is credited with the large-scale adoption of Christianity by the indigenous people of Taiwan.

She was the daughter of Iwal and Umin and she was called Ciwang Iwal after her mother. Accounts differ whether she was Sediq, Taroko, or Tayal. At the age of 18, she married Ma Feng, a Han Chinese merchant. He was later murdered by indigenous Taiwanese. Her second husband, Xinrong, was also Han Chinese. They had a daughter, Agil, before he died of illness.

When Taiwan came under Japanese rule in 1895, the mountain indigenous tribes resisted. Chi Oang, who had learned to speak Japanese, served as a translator and intermediary, persuading her fellow indigenous people to accept Japanese rule instead of being slaughtered.

In 1923, her third husband, Lin Jiaxing of Taichung, deserted her and stole her property. Furious and armed with a knife, she took the train to Taichung seeking revenge. On the train she met Li Shuiche, pastor of the Hualien Port Church, who introduced her to Christianity. She was baptized the following year. Despite her age of 58, in 1929, encouraged by Lillian Dickson and James Dickson, she trained to be a missionary at the Tamsui Presbyterian Women's Bible School. Under Japanese rule, foreigners and missionaries were forbidden from entering tribal areas, risking beatings and imprisonment. Chi Oang, as an indigenous person who was well regarded by the Japanese government, was able to move relatively freely and avoid arrest. She held Christian services in Taiwanese and Japanese, explaining key points of doctrine in indigenous languages. She is credited with the spread of Christianity in indigenous Taiwanese lands and has been called the Mother of Taiwan Aboriginal Faith or the Mother of the Mountain Church. By 1968 there were some 400 churches and 77 thousand parishioners in the mountainous indigenous areas of Taiwan.
