= Beimen District =

District in Tainan, Taiwan

Coordinates: 23°17′16.89″N 120°7′30.71″E

Beimen 北門區 Peimen
- Rural district
- Beimen District
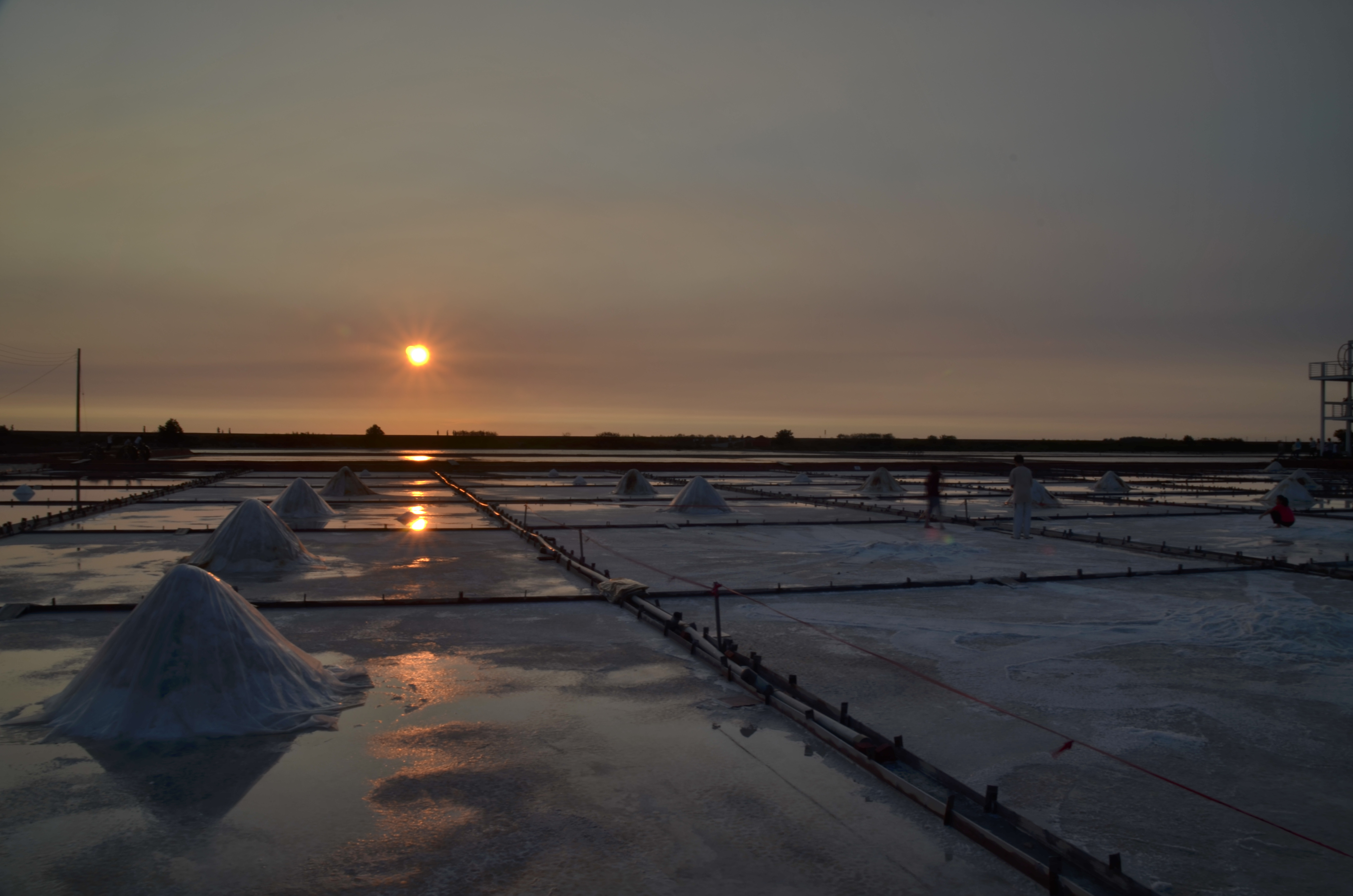
- Salt ponds in Beimen District

- Beimen District in Tainan City
- Location: Tainan, Taiwan

Area
  - Total: 44 km^{2} (17 sq mi)

Population (January 2023)
  - Total: 10,191
- Website: beimen.tainan.gov.tw/en/

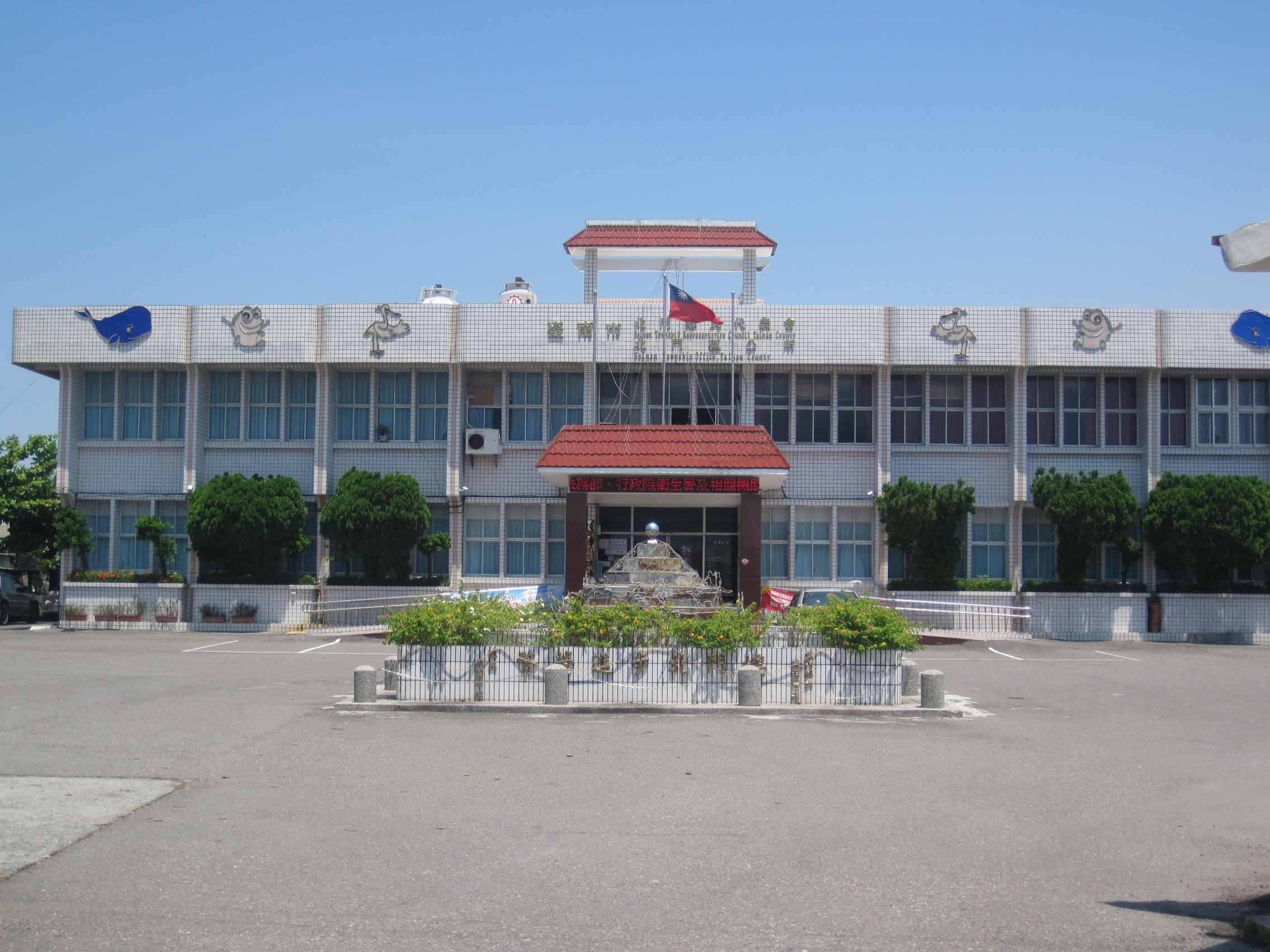
Beimen District Office

Beimen District (Chinese: 北門區; pinyin: Běimén Qū; Pe̍h-ōe-jī: Pak-mn̂g-khu) is a coastal district of about 10,191 residents in Tainan, Taiwan.

== History ==
After the handover of Taiwan from Japan to the Republic of China in 1945, Beimen was organized as a rural township of Tainan County. On 25 December 2010, Tainan County merged with Tainan City and Beimen was upgraded to a district of the city.

== Administrative divisions ==
Beimen is divided into Beimen, Yonglong, Yonghua, Yugang, Baoji, Tungbi, Kunjiang, Shuangchun, Jinhu, Cian, Sanguang, Zhongshu and Renli Villages.

== Tourist attractions ==
- Beimen Crystal Church
- Beimen Island Presbyterian Church
- Jingzaijiao Tile-paved Salt Fields
- Jishui River
- Taiwan Blackfoot Disease Socio-Medical Service Memorial House
- Nankunshen Temple
- Shuangchun Seashore Park
- Beimen Sports Park
- Luzhugou Fishing Harbor

== Transportation ==
Provincial Highway 84 connects the district to National freeway 1 and National Freeway 3. Provincial Highway 61 also runs through the district.

== Notable natives ==
- Wang King-ho, former physician
- Wu Mi-cha, Director of National Palace Museum
