= Edwin Whitefield =

British-American painter

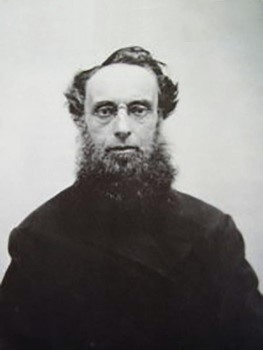
- Born: September 22, 1816; East Lulworth, near Wareham, Dorset, England
- Died: December 26, 1892 (aged 76); Dedham, Massachusetts
- Other name: Edwin Whitefield Pennie
- Known for: landscape artist

Edwin Whitefield (September 22, 1816 – December 26, 1892) was a landscape artist who is best known for his lithographed views of North American cities and for a number of illustrated books on colonial homes in New England. He was a noted illustrator of native American flora.

== Early life ==
Born in East Lulworth, near Wareham, Dorset, England, he emigrated to the United States in 1838.

== Career ==
Whitefield visited a series of North American cities, where he published books reproducing the paintings he made there. His collections were published by subscription. The cities he visited included Brooklyn (1845), Toronto (1851), Quebec City (1852), Montreal (1853-1854), Hamilton, Ontario (1854), Ithaca, New York (1855), Jamestown (1882), and Boston (1889).

In 1856, after visiting Minnesota, he made it his home, using landscapes to help persuade those seeking land to let him play a role in their purchases.

Whitefield Township in Kandiyohi County, Minnesota is named for the artist while nearby Lake Lillian was named for Whitefield's wife.

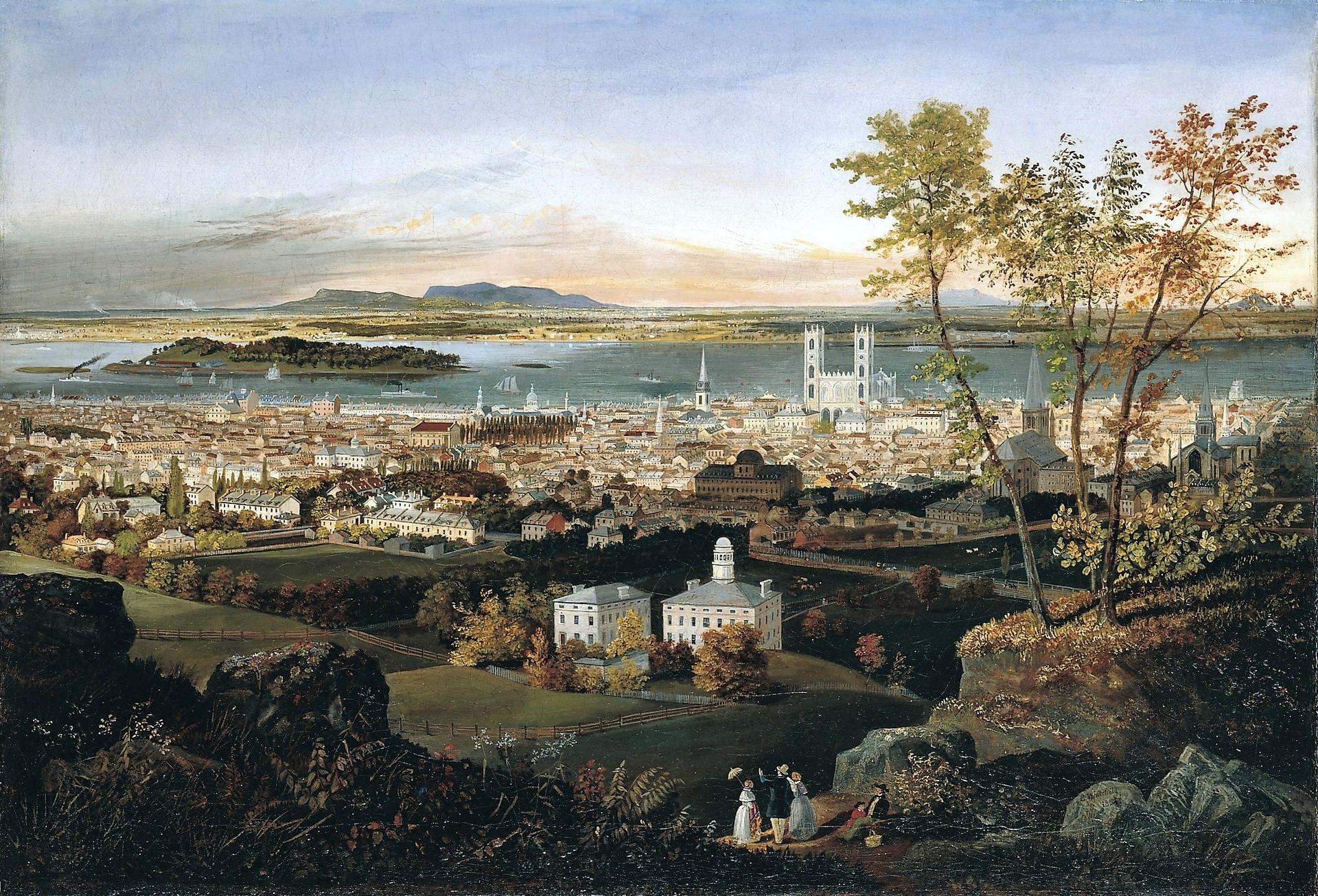
Montreal painted by Whitefield in 1853-54

He illustrated native American flora. Some of his illustrations were included in the 1848-1850 volumes by Asa B. Strong titled The American Flora and in the 1845 volume by Emma C Embury, American Wildflowers in Their Native Haunts.

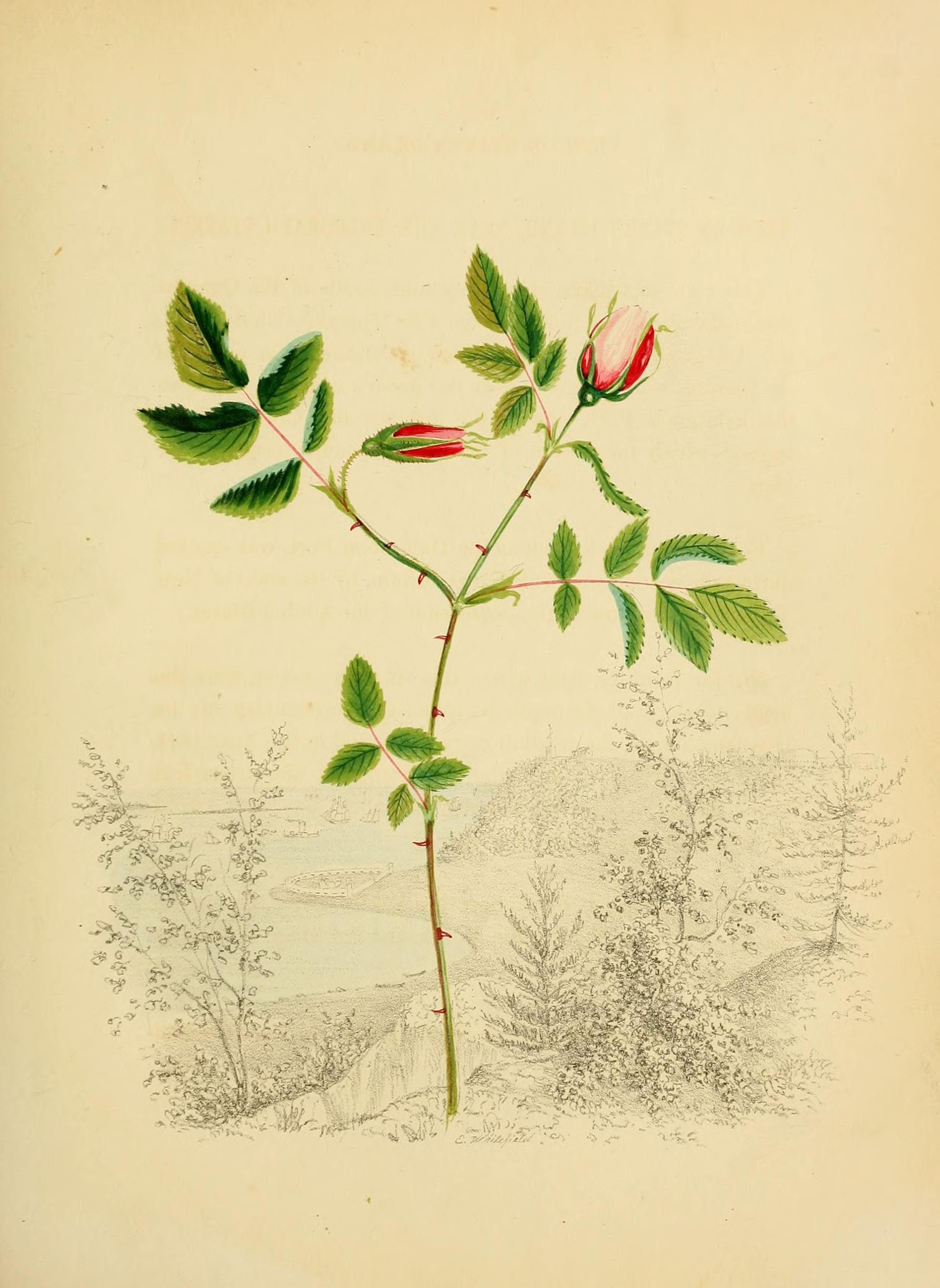
American Wildflowers in their Native Haunts

He died in Dedham, Massachusetts.
