= Lilyan =

Lilyan may refer to:

- Lilyan Chauvin (1925–2008), French-American actress, television host, director, writer and acting teacher
- Lilyan Tashman (1896–1934), American actress
- Lilab, Iran, a village also known as Lilyan

== See also ==
- Lillian (disambiguation)
