= Lillian Siyoi =

Kenyan politician

Lilian Siyoi
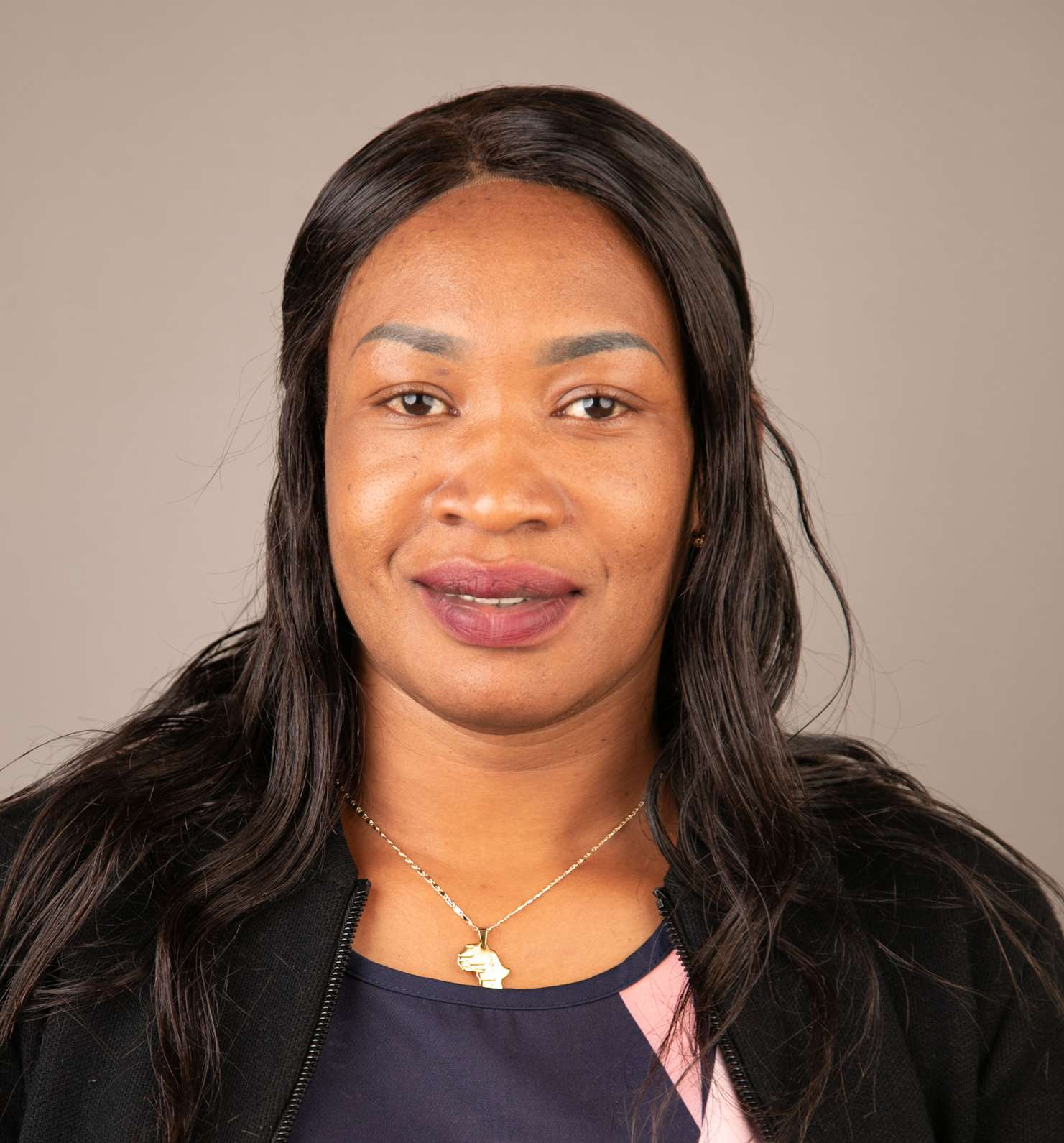
- Official 2022 portrait

Woman Representative for Trans-Nzoia County
- Incumbent
- Assumed office 9 August 2022
- Preceded by: Janet Nangabo Wanyama

Personal details
- Party: UDA

Lilian Chebet Siyoi Walubengo is a Kenyan politician who is currently a member of the Kenya National Assembly as the woman representative for Trans-Nzoia. She is a member of the UDA. She was educated at the Kenya Institute of Social Work and Community Development and worked at Handicap International. She came under controversy in early 2025 by criticising Trans-Nzoia County Governor George Natembeya. She is Kalenjin.
