= Beimen Crystal Church =

Tourist attraction in Beimen, Tainan, Taiwan

- 北門水晶教堂 (Chinese)
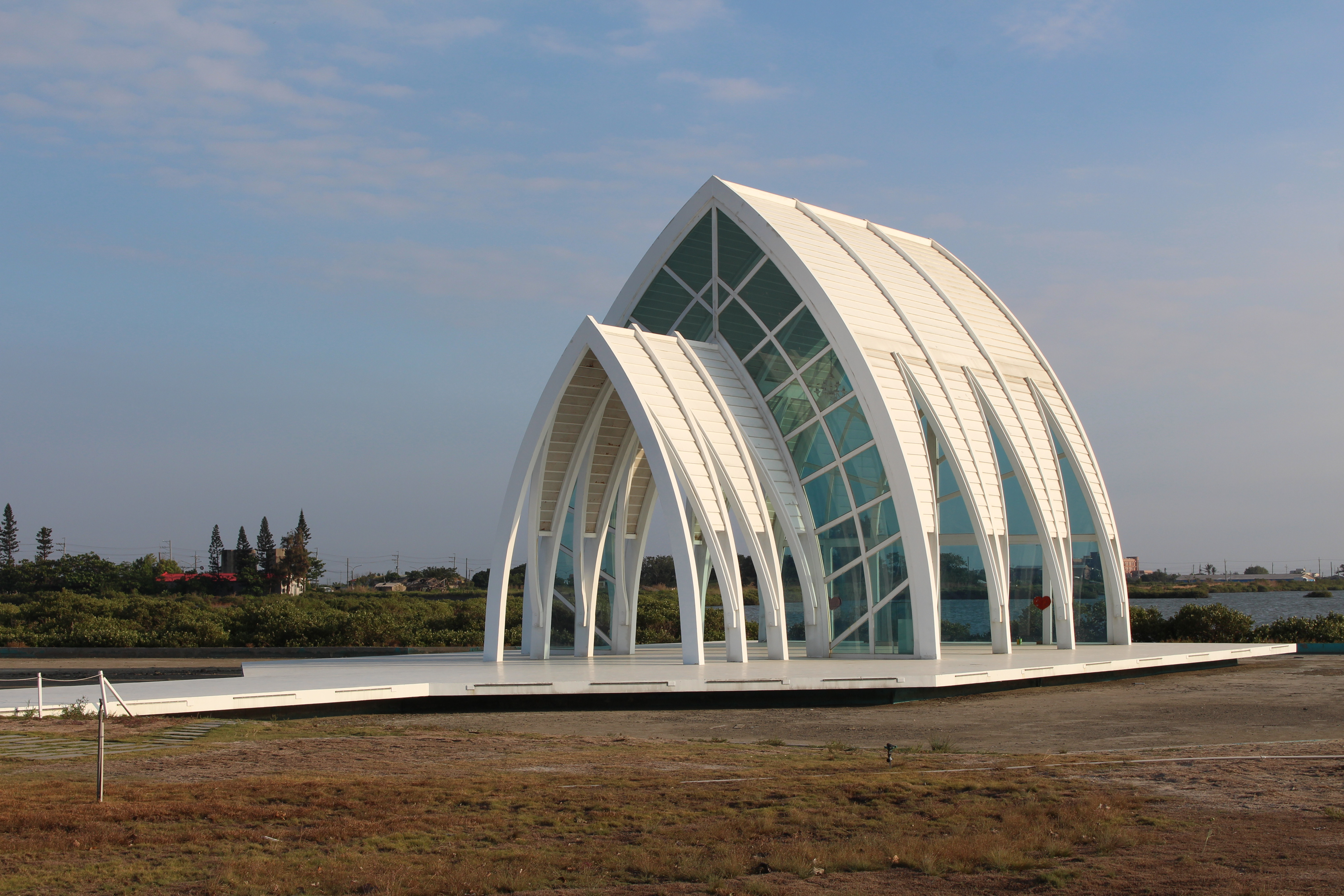
- Year: October 2014
- Location: Beimen, Tainan, Taiwan; 23°16′N 120°07′E

The Beimen Crystal Church (traditional Chinese: 北門水晶教堂; simplified Chinese: 北门水晶教堂; pinyin: Běimén Shuǐjīng Jiàotáng) is an art installation in Beimen District, Tainan, Taiwan. The structure was opened in October 2014. Despite its name, it is not consecrated as a church but is occasionally used as a chapel for weddings.

== Architecture ==
The structure was designed with transparent color and decorated with many outdoor art installations located at the side of a lake. It features a square stone in the shape of a piano. The visitor center is painted with various love-shaped theme artworks.

== Transportation ==
The structure is accessible by bus from Xinying Station of Taiwan Railway.

- Singing Bus
  - 【61】 Xinying Train Station－Nankenshen Temple－Cigu Salt Mountain
  - 【BR1】 Xinying Train Station－Beimen Junior High School
- Shingnan Bus
  - 【B2】 Jiali Bus Station－Syuejia District Office－Nankenshen Temple
