= Jake Nordin =

American football player (born 1984)

No. 82, 85, 86
- Position: Tight end

Personal information
- Born: July 8, 1984 (age 42); Lake Lillian, Minnesota, U.S.
- Listed height: 6 ft 3 in (1.91 m)
- Listed weight: 261 lb (118 kg)

Career information
- College: Northern Illinois
- NFL draft: 2007: undrafted

Career history
- New England Patriots (2007)*; Washington Redskins (2007)*; New York Giants (2007)*; Baltimore Ravens (2007); Detroit Lions (2008–2009)*; Minnesota Vikings (2009)*; Las Vegas Locomotives (2009); Detroit Lions (2009–2010); Las Vegas Locomotives (2010–2011)
- * Offseason or practice squad member only

Awards and highlights
- UFL champion (2009)

Career NFL statistics
- Receptions: 2
- Receiving yards: 26
- Stats at Pro Football Reference

Jake Nordin (born July 8, 1984) is an American former professional football player who was a tight end in the National Football League (NFL). He was signed by the New England Patriots as an undrafted free agent in 2007. He played college football for the Northern Illinois Huskies. Nordin also played high school football at ACGC High School in Grove City, Minnesota, helping the school to win a State title.
