= Jingzaijiao Tile-paved Salt Fields =

Salt evaporation pond in Beimen, Tainan, Taiwan

Jingzaijiao Tile-paved Salt Fields 井仔腳瓦盤鹽田
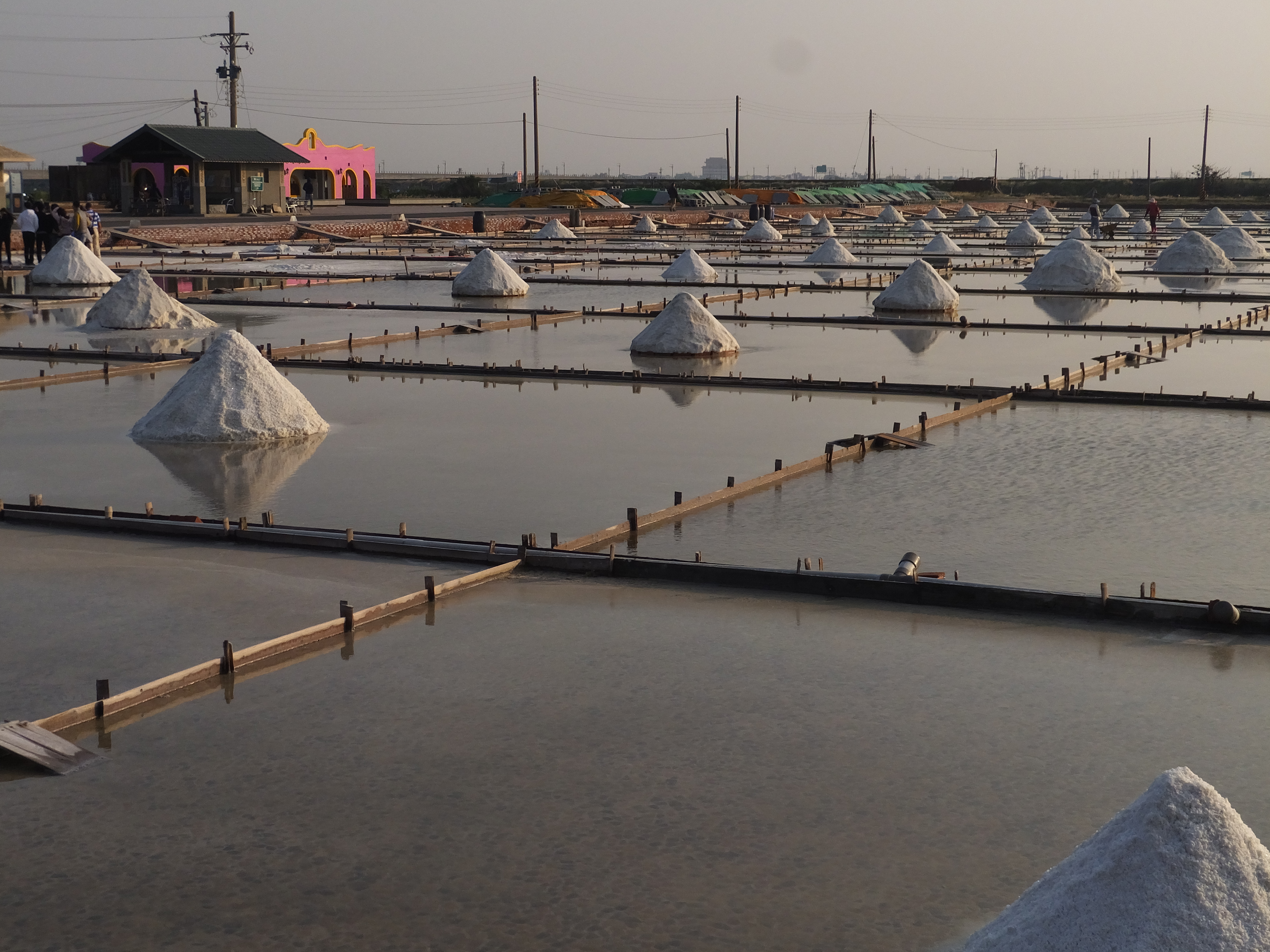
- Town/City: Beimen, Tainan, Taiwan
- Coordinates: 23°15′31.9″N 120°6′27.4″E
- Established: 1818
- Produces: kosher salt

The Jingzaijiao Tile-paved Salt Fields (traditional Chinese: 井仔腳瓦盤鹽田; simplified Chinese: 井仔脚瓦盘盐田; pinyin: Jǐngzǐjiǎo Wǎpán Yántián) are salt ponds in Beimen District, Tainan, Taiwan.

== History ==
Originally established in 1818 by salt farmers as the Laidong Salt Fields, the field is the oldest salt field in Taiwan. The site was originally a desert. It was then later procured by Taiwan Salt Company. In 1952, the field area was redesigned and the field became the only central-style tiled-paved salt field in Taiwan. Due to the declining business of salt industry, groups had been actively advocating for the revival of the field, thus the field had then been restored for tourism purpose.

== Architecture ==
The fields consist of many individual square plots. In order to prevent salt crystals from adhering to the dirt, the plots are lined with pieces of broken pottery.

== See also ==
- Agriculture in Taiwan
