= Liliane =

- Pronunciation: French: [liljan]
- Gender: Female

Origin
- Origin: French

Liliane is a given name for women, most often used where French is spoken, a variant of Lillian and Lily.

== People with this name ==
- Liliane Ackermann (1938–2007), French writer of a Jewish family
- Liliane Bettencourt (1922–2017), the second richest person in France
- Liliane Carlberg (1936–2024), Swedish television producer
- Liliane Chappuis (1955–2007), Swiss politician
- Liliane de Kermadec (1928–2020), French film director and screenwriter
- Liliane Klein-Lieber (1924–2020), French resistance member
- Liliane Massala (born 1964), Gabonese diplomat
- Liliane Maury Pasquier (born 1956), Swiss politician
- Liliane Montevecchi (1932–2018), French actress, dancer, and singer
- Liliane Nemri, Lebanese actress
- Liliane Saint-Pierre (born 1948), Belgian singer
- Leelee Sobieski (born 1983, real name Liliane), American actress
