= Lillian Elidah =

Zambian chef

- Born: Lusaka, Zambia
- Education: Cesar Ritz Culinary Arts Academy
- Culinary career
- Cooking style: European/African cuisine
- Current restaurant(s): Twaala Restaurant

Lillian Elidah is a Zambian chef, who is a graduate of the Cesar Ritz Culinary Arts Academy in Switzerland and now owns and runs her restaurant Twaala, in Lusaka, Zambia.

== Career ==
Lillian Elidah was born in Lusaka, Zambia, but most of her childhood was spent in Sweden, where she graduated from college. She decided to become a professional chef, and trained at Cesar Ritz Culinary Arts Academy in Switzerland where she achieved a Foundation Degree in Culinary Arts. After training in Switzerland, she worked in France as a chef where she was mentored by Anthony Leboube.

At the age of 19, she became the food writer for the Zambian national newspaper The Post, the youngest writer they had on staff. She started her own catering company, Twaala Catering, and opened a restaurant named the Twaala Restaurant. At the restaurant, she serves European/African fusion cuisine. Her entrepreneurial work was highlighted in a report by the private enterprise programme Nyamuka Zambia, funded by the UK Department for International Development.
