= Lillian, West Virginia =

Lillian
- Unincorporated community
- Location within the state of West Virginia Lillian (the United States)
- Coordinates: 39°6′55″N 80°3′55″W
- Country: United States
- State: West Virginia
- County: Barbour
- Elevation: 1,332 ft (406 m)
- Time zone: UTC-5 (Eastern (EST))
  - Summer (DST): UTC-4 (EDT)
- GNIS ID: 1697106

Lillian was an unincorporated community in Barbour County, West Virginia, United States.
