= Lillian Gilkes =

American author and educator

Lillian Gilkes (also Lillian B. Gilkes, full name Lillian Barnard Gilkes) (1900–1976, 1902–1977 1903–1977) was an American author and educator, best known for her biography of Cora Crane and expertise in Stephen Crane.

== Career ==
Gilkes was a professor at New York University.

Gilkes served as director of the New York Writers School, sponsored by the pro-Soviet Popular Front organization, the League of American Writers. Gilkes also served on the board of directors of the League of American Writers along with Myra Page, Aline Bernstein, Dorothy Brewster, and Genevieve Taggard.

She was a member of the Progressive Party (United States, 1948).

== Personal life and death ==
Gilkes was born in Jacksonville, Florida. Gilkes' life was "marked by political activity and connections with radical artists and writers of the early to mid-20th century."

A close, long-term friend of Gilke's was Dorothy Brewster; they often lived and traveled together.

In 1976, she was living in Tryon, North Carolina.

Gilkes died in 1977.

== Legacy ==
The Lillian B. Gilkes Papers at Syracuse University include:

- Corresponsdence:
  - Family: Louise Davidson, Fannie Gilkes, Fannie E. Taylor
  - Authors: Benjamin Appel, Margaret Culkin Banning, Paul Corey, Martha Dodd Stern, Janet Flanner, Gladys Benjamin Goddard, Josephine Herbst, Robert Hillyer, Langston Hughes, Helen R. Hull, Ruth Lechlitner, Robert Morss Lovett, Grace Lumpkin, Marjorie Kinnan Rawlings, Jennings Rice, Felizia Seyd, Genevieve Taggard, Richard Wright, Leane Zugsmith
  - Gilkes co-authors: Millen Brand, Dorothy Brewster
  - Performing artists: Geradine Farrar, Georgette Leblanc, Eva Le Gallienne, Enrico Caruso, Dorothy Caruso
  - Politicians: Henry A. Wallace
  - Publishers: Margaret C. Anderson, Houghton Mifflin, Charles Scribner's Sons
- Subjects: anti-ballistic missile systems, an anti-fascist anthology project, Gilkes' New York University short story writing class, Richard Nixon and Watergate, the Progressive Party, and the Southern Tenant Farmers Union and Works Progress Administration (WPA)

== Works ==
Between 1926 and 1972, Gilkes more than twenty articles, numerous book reviews, and three books.

Alan M. Wald called Cora Crane: A Biography "the definitive life history."

Books written:

- Short story craft. An introduction to short story writing (1949)
- Cora Crane; a biography of Mrs. Stephen Crane (1960)

Books edited:

- Book of contemporary short stories (1936)
- Stephen Crane, letters with by R.W. Stallman (1960)
- Wedding by Grace Lumpkin with afterword by Lillian Barnard Gilkes (1976 reprint of 1936 original)

== See also ==
- League of American Writers
- Grace Lumpkin
- Myra Page
