= Lillian Palmer =

Lillian Palmer is the name of:

- Lillian Palmer (athlete) (1913–2001), Canadian athlete who competed in the 1932 Summer Olympics
- Lillian McNeill Palmer (1871–1961), Californian metal work artist, partner of Emily Williams
