= Lake Lillian (Kandiyohi County, Minnesota) =

Lake in the state of Minnesota, United States

- Location within Minnesota
- Location: Kandiyohi County, Minnesota
- Coordinates: 44°57′51″N 94°52′30″W
- Type: lake

Lake Lillian is a lake in Kandiyohi County, in the U.S. state of Minnesota.

Lake Lillian was named for the wife of Edwin Whitefield, an artist who visited the area with explorers in the 1850s.

The lake is located directly north of the town Lake Lillian and has a total area of 1,149 acres.

== See also ==
- List of lakes in Minnesota
