= Lillian Greneker =

American businesswoman, inventor, and mannequin designer (1895–1990)

- Lillian Greneker, from a 1937 newspaper
- Born: Lillian Louise Lidman; August 27, 1895; Savannah, Georgia, US
- Died: January 28, 1990 (aged 94); Englewood, New Jersey, US
- Occupations: businesswoman, inventor, mannequin designer

Lillian Greneker (August 27, 1895 – January 28, 1990) was an American businesswoman, inventor, and mannequin designer.

== Early life ==
Lillian Louise Lidman was born in Savannah, Georgia, the daughter of William F. Lidman and Louise Anderson Lidman. Her parents were immigrants from Sweden. The Lidman family moved to Chicago when Lillian was young. She attended a Swedenborgian boarding school in Ohio.

== Career ==
=== Design and mannequin business ===
As a young woman, Lillian Lidman was a musical performer on the stage, touring with a stock company out of Chicago. She also designed costumes for theatre. After she married, she lived in the New York area, and designed and built several houses in Mount Kisco, New York. After her husband asked her to create lightweight poseable mannequins for a theatre lobby display, she patented her designs, including one with colleague Cora Scovil, and formed the Greneker Corporation with Edgar Rosenthal in 1937, to produce mannequins. She built mannequins with rubber waists, to allow cinching into a "wasp" silhouette as well as more natural positioning. "Many claimes to 'firsts' in mannequin art are credited to Mrs. Greneker," explained a 1939 newspaper account.

She talked about her work with host Adelaide Hawley on an early television program, "The Lady Means Business", in 1946. In 1951 she left the Greneker Corporation and founded Lillian Greneker Inc., adding other display items and theatrical props to her product line. Greneker's company moved to Los Angeles after World War II.

=== Other inventions, art and film ===
Greneker invented the Fingertip, a thimble with various gadget attachments, in the 1930s. When her mannequin factory in Pleasantville, New York, was converted for defense use during World War II, she invented a disposable self-sealing gas tank for planes and submarines. In 1978, she received one more patent, an update to her thimble concept.

Lillian Greneker exhibited her sculptures in New York in the 1950s. She worked on a new design for theatrical sets in the 1950s, to make lightweight papier-mâché dimensional backdrops. In 1970 she was credited as production designer on a horror film, Guru, the Mad Monk.

== Personal life and legacy ==
Lillian Lidman married Claude Pritchard Greneker, a theatre publicist, in 1921. She was widowed in 1949, and she died in 1990, aged 94 years, at an actors' nursing home in New Jersey. Her papers are at the Schlesinger Library at Harvard, and include plays and poems she wrote, photographs, and clippings.

Her house in Mount Kisco is now known as the Greneker Retreat, and the gardens are open once a year for tours. The Greneker mannequin company remains in operation, based in Los Angeles, though the manufacturing now occurs in China. In 2018, a Greneker mannequin nicknamed "Starman" was seated behind the wheel of an Elon Musk's Tesla Roadster and launched into space by SpaceX.
