= Lillian Smith =

Lillian Smith may refer to:

- Lillian Smith (author) (1897–1966), American author Strange Fruit 1944
  - Lillian Smith Book Award
- Lillian Smith (trick shooter) (1871–1930), American trick shooter with Buffalo Bill
- Lillian Rita Smith (1912–1993), New Zealand communist
- Lillian H. Smith (1887–1983), Canadian children's librarian
