= Lake Lillian, Minnesota =

City in Minnesota, United States

Lake Lillian
- City
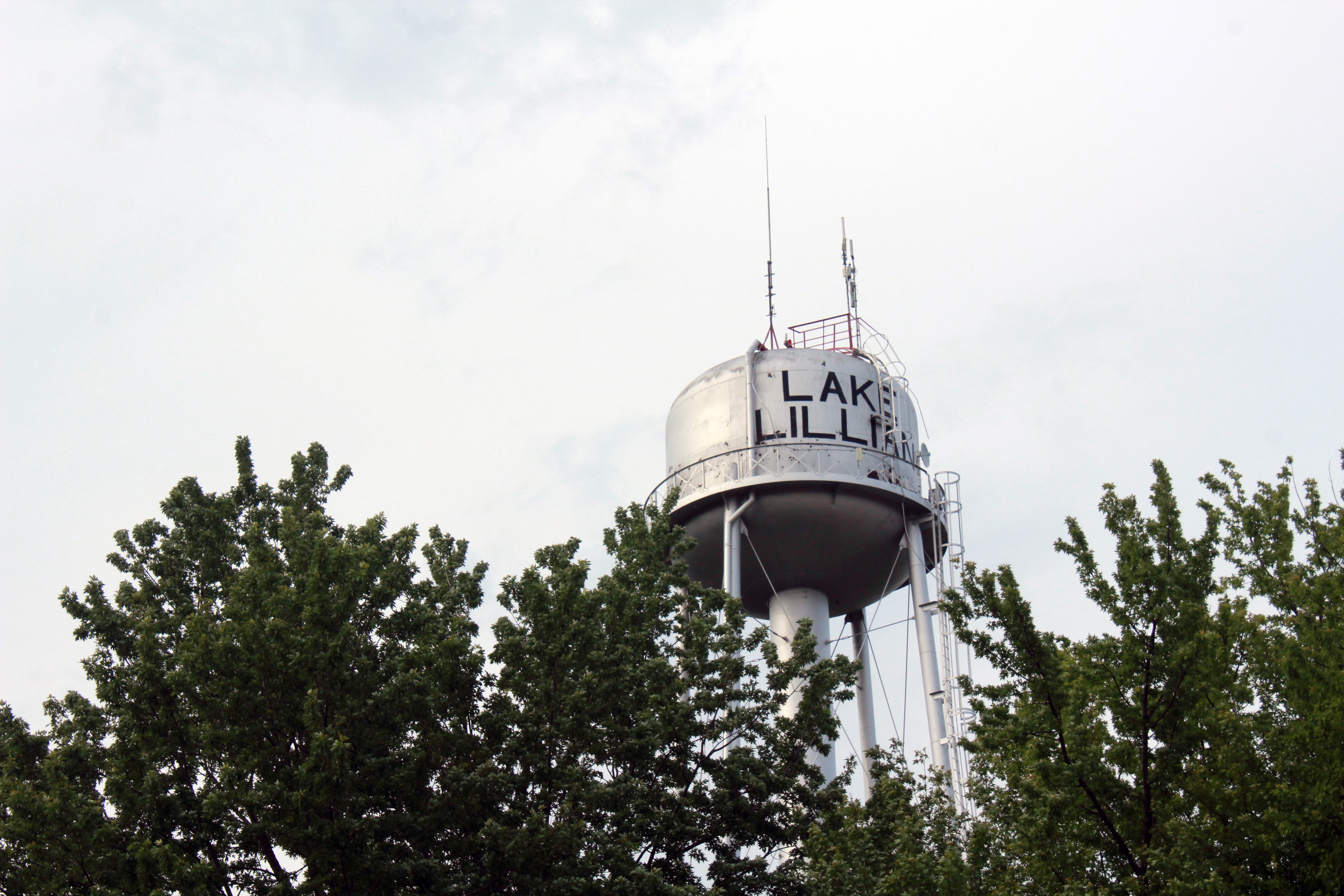
- Water tower
- Motto: "A Friendly Town"
- Location of Lake Lillian, Minnesota
- Coordinates: 44°56′46″N 94°52′47″W
- Country: United States
- State: Minnesota
- County: Kandiyohi

Area
  - Total: 0.45 sq mi (1.17 km^{2})
  - Land: 0.45 sq mi (1.17 km^{2})
  - Water: 0 sq mi (0.00 km^{2})
- Elevation: 1,102 ft (336 m)

Population (2020)
  - Total: 246
  - Density: 543.5/sq mi (209.85/km^{2})
- Time zone: UTC-6 (Central (CST))
  - Summer (DST): UTC-5 (CDT)
- ZIP code: 56253
- Area code: 320
- FIPS code: 27-34676
- GNIS feature ID: 2395593
- Website: lakelillian.govoffice.com

Lake Lillian is a city in Kandiyohi County, Minnesota, United States. The population was 246 at the 2020 census.

== History ==
The town of Lake Lillian formed in February 1923 when railroad tracks were laid for the Luce Line Railroad. The name Lake Lillian came from the nearby lake Lake Lillian. The lake was named after Lillian Whitefield, wife of Edwin Whitefield who explored this area in 1856. The town was incorporated on February 25, 1926. The first school was built in Lake Lillian in 1913. In 1926, there was a report of oil being discovered in the city limits. During World War II, a hemp processing plan was built near Lake Lillian to help the war effort. In 1955, a new school was built. In 1965, Lake Lillian voted to approve the sale of liquor.

=== Lake Lillian Farmers Cooperative Elevator explosion ===
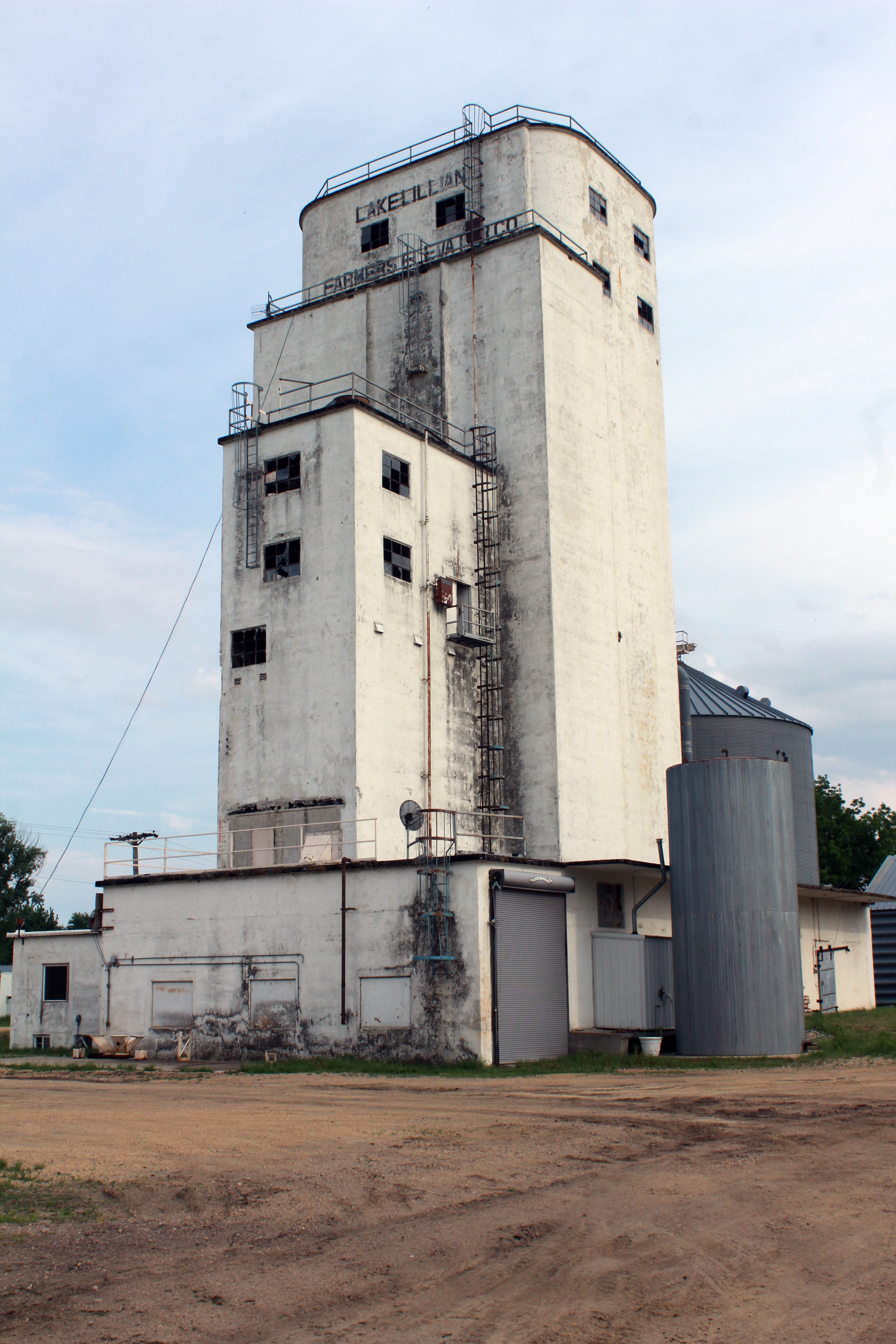
Lake Lillian Farmers Cooperative Elevator in 2025

On Friday, May 11, 1984, an explosion occurred at the Lake Lillian Farmers Cooperative Elevator in Minnesota. The blast killed two men and injured four others. The explosion was attributed to grain dust ignited by a spark, possibly from a small rock or piece of concrete or metal in the grinding and mix room. Among the victims, Lawrence Fuchs and Steve Nelson suffered fatal burns, while David Garberich and others endured severe injuries. The structure sustained significant damage, but its design prevented total collapse by allowing pressure from the explosion to escape through large windows on the upper floors.

OSHA officials conducted an investigation and identified grain dust as the primary hazard. This incident prompted changes in safety practices at the facility, including the installation of dust vacuum systems during grain unloading. The tragedy led to increased awareness of the dangers of grain dust, influencing workplace safety regulations and prompting federal hearings on the issue. The elevator building stands today but is no longer in use.

== Geography ==
According to the United States Census Bureau, the city has a total area of 0.46 square miles (1.19 km^{2}), all land.

Minnesota State Highway 7 serves as a main route in the community.

Directly to the north is Lake Lillian which has a total area of 1,149 acres.

== Demographics ==
Historical population
| Census | Pop. | Note | %± |
|---|---|---|---|
| 1930 | 206 | | — |
| 1940 | 271 | | 31.6% |
| 1950 | 358 | | 32.1% |
| 1960 | 335 | | −6.4% |
| 1970 | 316 | | −5.7% |
| 1980 | 329 | | 4.1% |
| 1990 | 229 | | −30.4% |
| 2000 | 257 | | 12.2% |
| 2010 | 238 | | −7.4% |
| 2020 | 246 | | 3.4% |
U.S. Decennial Census

=== 2010 census ===
As of the census of 2010, there were 238 people, 121 households, and 61 families living in the city. The population density was 517.4 inhabitants per square mile (199.8/km^{2}). There were 136 housing units at an average density of 295.7 per square mile (114.2/km^{2}). The racial makeup of the city was 98.3% White, 0.4% African American, 0.4% Asian, and 0.8% from two or more races. Hispanic or Latino of any race were 2.1% of the population.

There were 121 households, of which 19.0% had children under the age of 18 living with them, 38.8% were married couples living together, 8.3% had a female householder with no husband present, 3.3% had a male householder with no wife present, and 49.6% were non-families. 43.8% of all households were made up of individuals, and 23.1% had someone living alone who was 65 years of age or older. The average household size was 1.96 and the average family size was 2.72.

The median age in the city was 46.6 years. 18.9% of residents were under the age of 18; 10.1% were between the ages of 18 and 24; 17.5% were from 25 to 44; 28.2% were from 45 to 64; and 25.2% were 65 years of age or older. The gender makeup of the city was 52.1% male and 47.9% female.

=== 2000 census ===
As of the census of 2000, there were 257 people, 124 households, and 71 families living in the city. The population density was 559.0 inhabitants per square mile (215.8/km^{2}). There were 135 housing units at an average density of 293.6 per square mile (113.4/km^{2}). The racial makeup of the city was 99.22% White, 0.78% from other races. Hispanic or Latino of any race were 4.28% of the population.

There were 124 households, out of which 22.6% had children under the age of 18 living with them, 42.7% were married couples living together, 8.1% had a female householder with no husband present, and 42.7% were non-families. 38.7% of all households were made up of individuals, and 21.0% had someone living alone who was 65 years of age or older. The average household size was 2.07 and the average family size was 2.75.

In the city, the population was spread out, with 22.6% under the age of 18, 5.8% from 18 to 24, 24.9% from 25 to 44, 23.3% from 45 to 64, and 23.3% who were 65 years of age or older. The median age was 43 years. For every 100 females, there were 99.2 males. For every 100 females age 18 and over, there were 91.3 males.

The median income for a household in the city was $26,458, and the median income for a family was $31,875. Males had a median income of $29,205 versus $19,500 for females. The per capita income for the city was $16,881. About 9.7% of families and 14.6% of the population were below the poverty line, including 21.7% of those under the age of eighteen and 12.7% of those 65 or over.

== Notable people ==
- Jake Nordin, professional football player

== Gallery ==
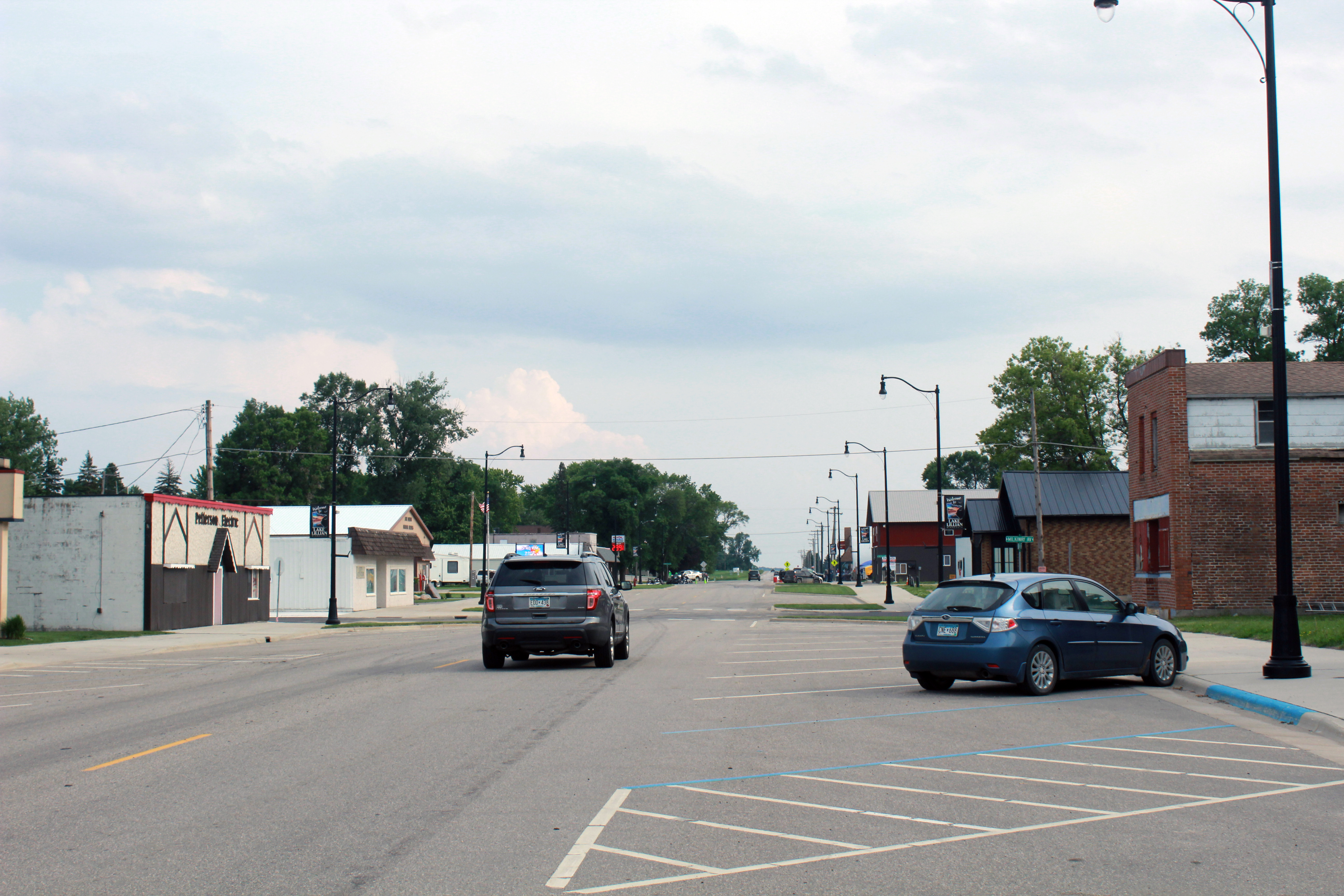
Lakeview Street at Milkiway Avenue

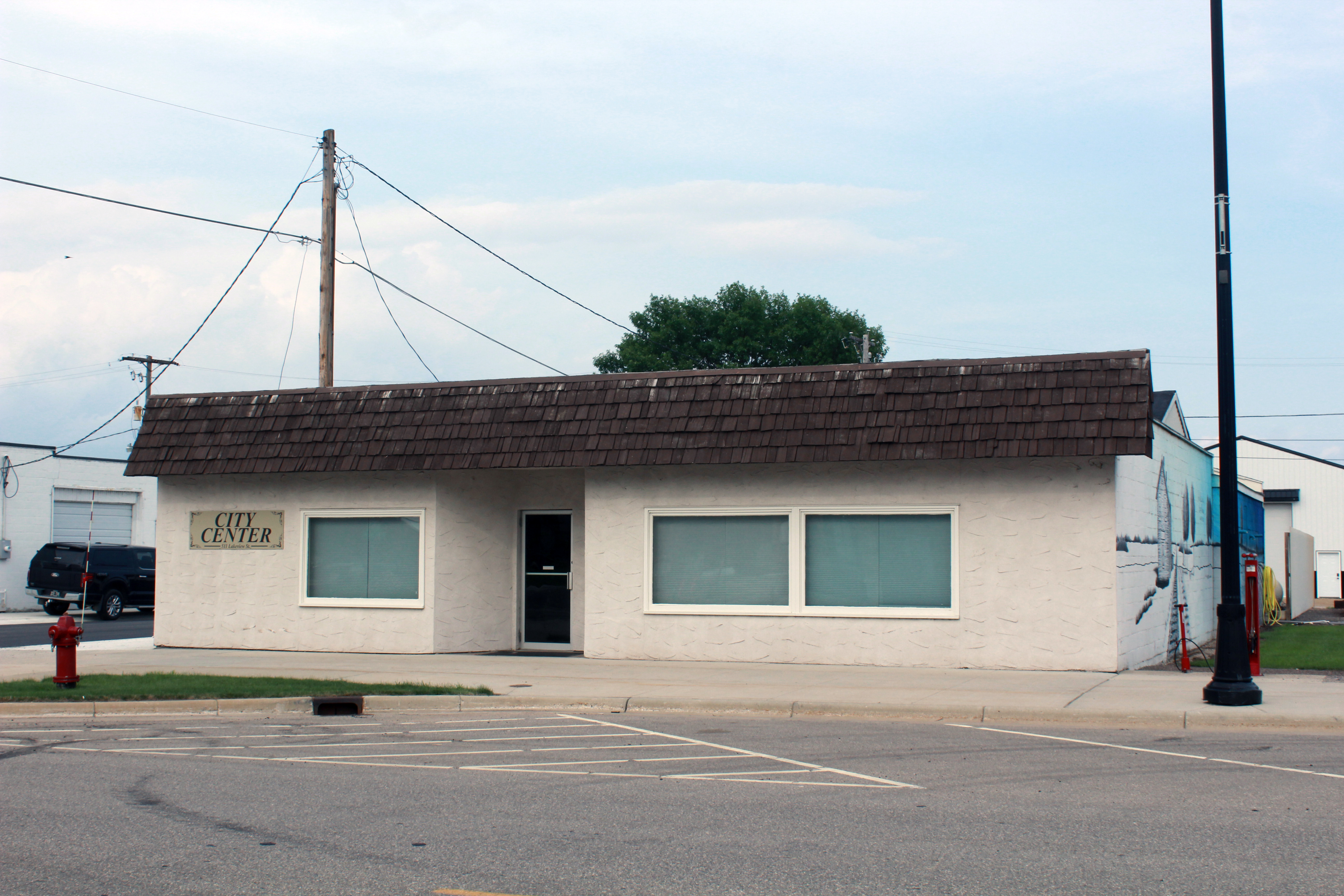
City Hall

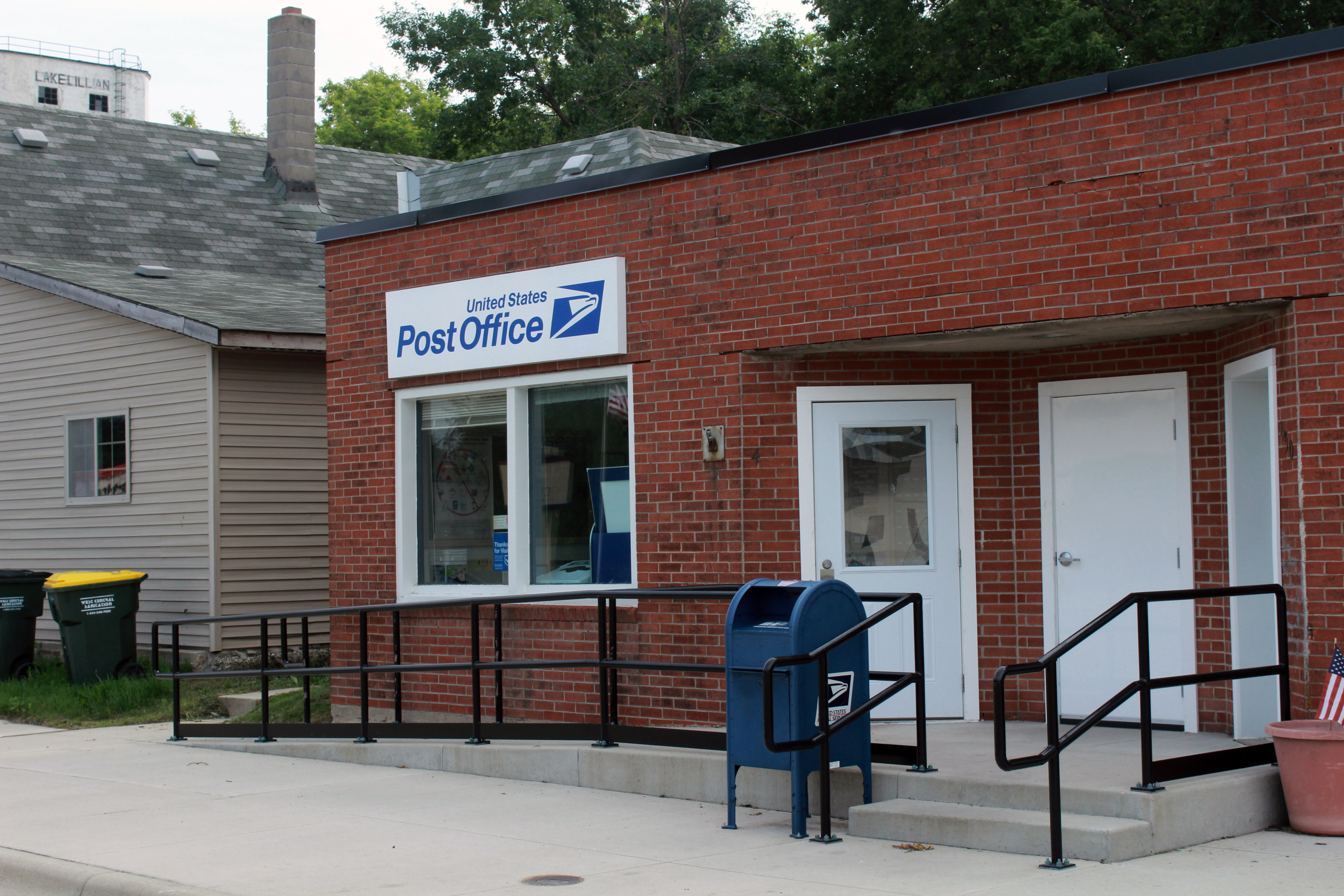
Post Office

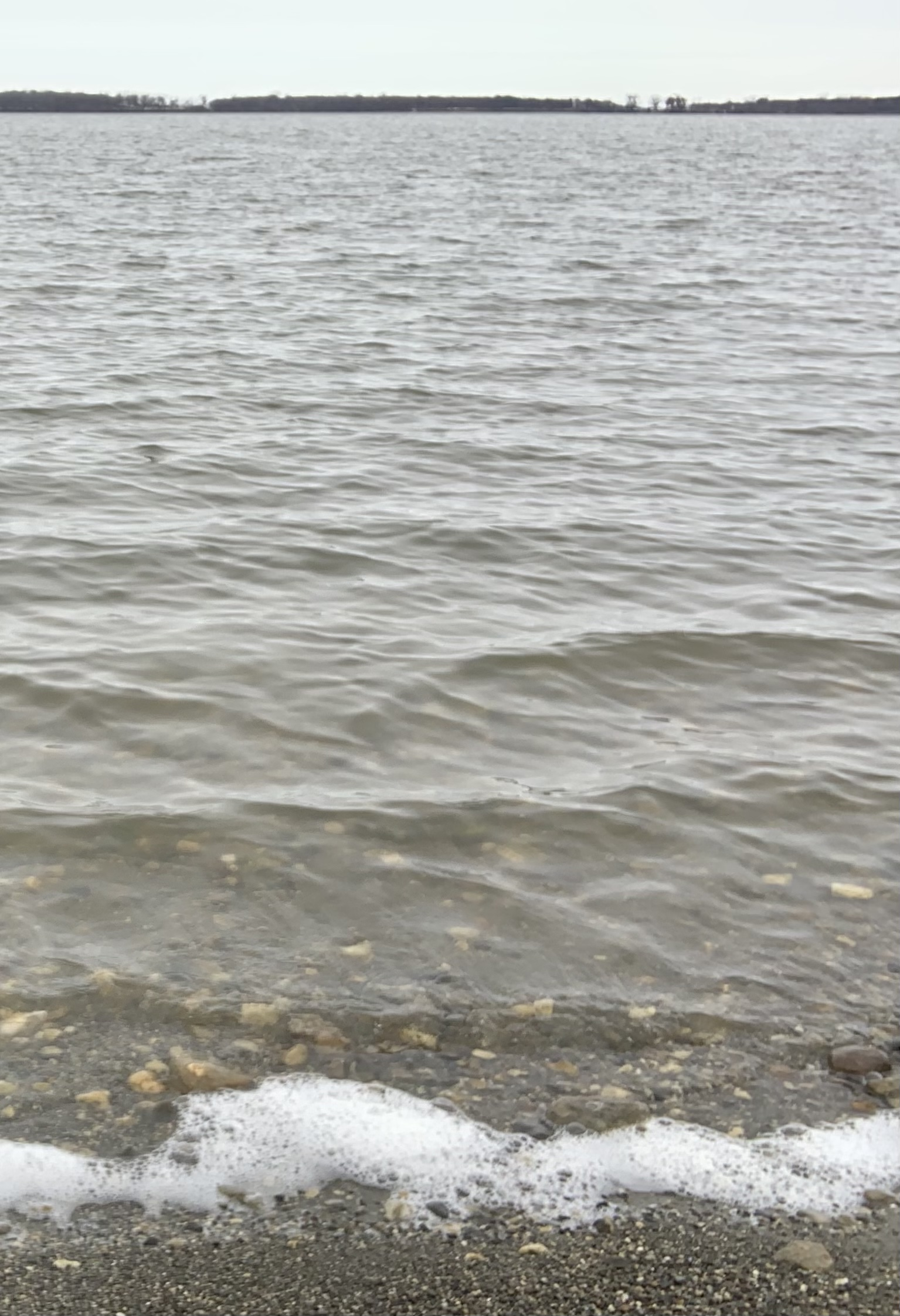
Lake Lillian

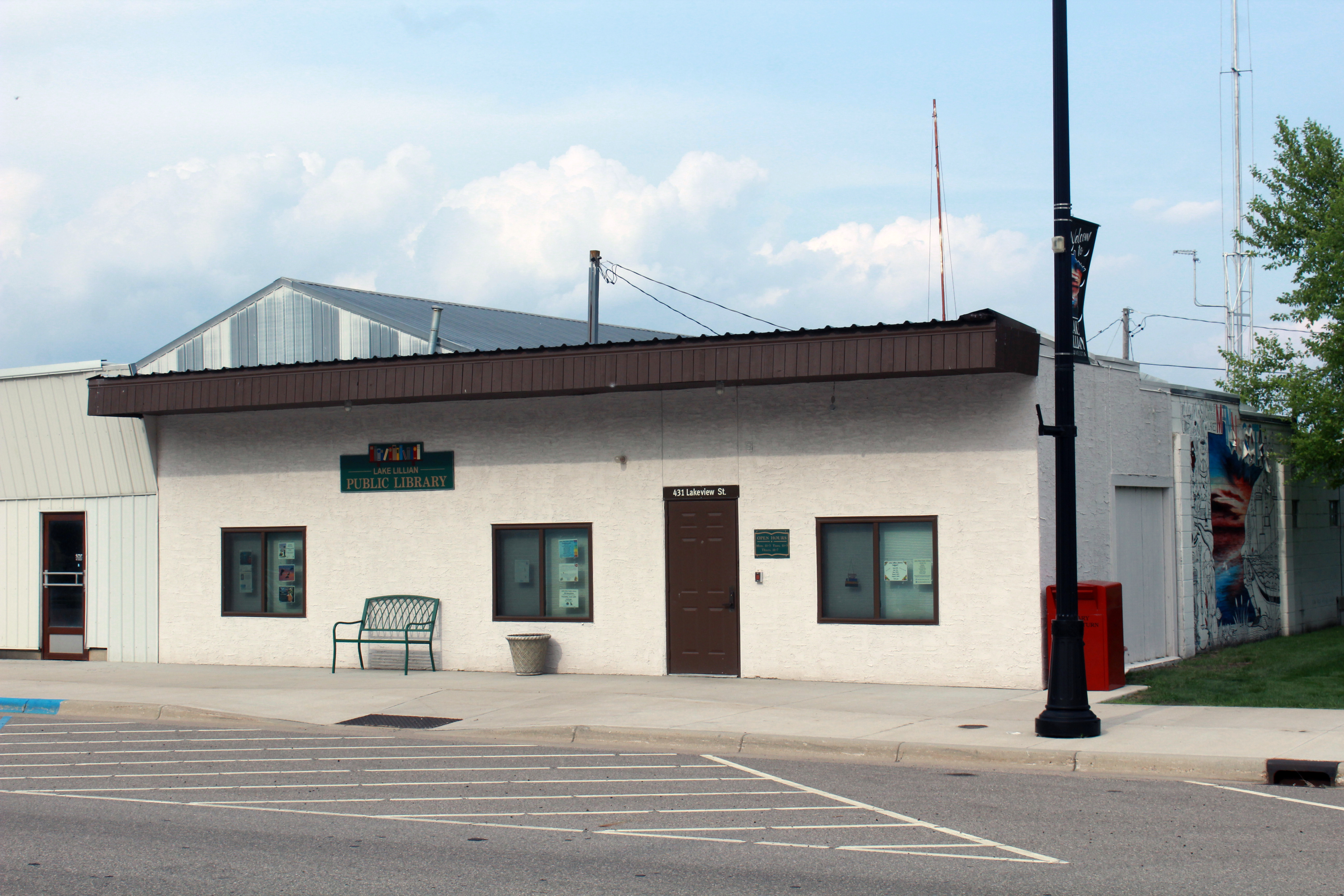

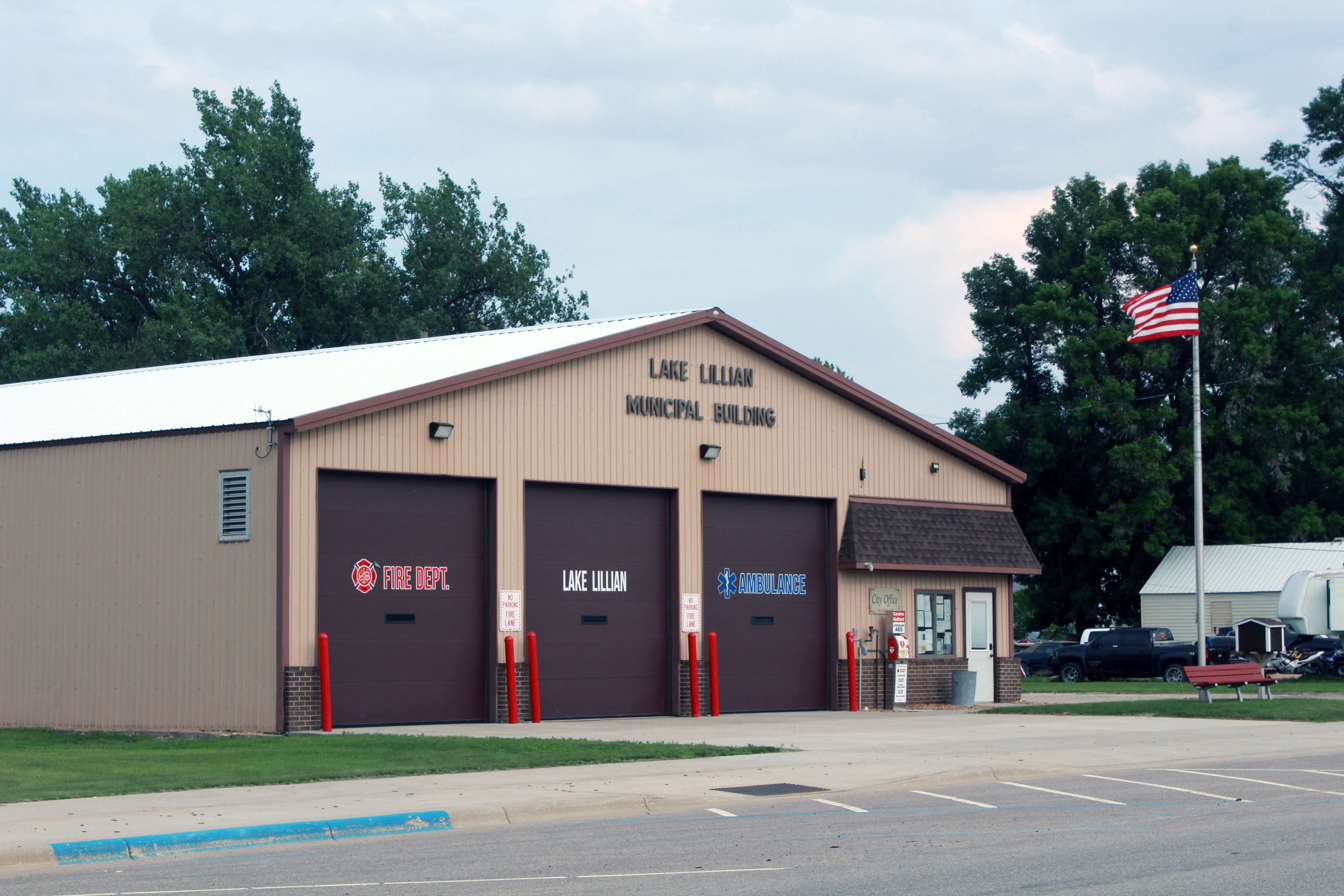
Fire Department-Municipal Building
