= Lillian Zinkant =

Irish camogie player

Personal information
- Native name: Liliadh Níc Uincaint (Irish)
- Born: Cork, Ireland

Sport
- Sport: Camogie
Club
- Years: Club
- Blackrock

Lillian Zinkant is a camogie player, who won a Minor All Ireland medal as part of the Cork Minor team.

After her retirement, Zinkant did some of the camogie coaching of the different teams.

== See also ==
- Wikipedia List of Camogie players
