= Mustard Seed International =

International Christian organization

- Founder: Lillian Dickson
- Founded at: Formosa
- Website: mustardseed.org

Mustard Seed International (MSI) is an interdenominational Christian organization. It was established in Formosa (now Taiwan) by Lillian Dickson after World War II.

== History ==
After the war, Dickson and her husband returned to Formosa to continue their ministry work. The work eventually evolved into what is now known as Mustard Seed International.

During the 1960s, MSI supported clinics worldwide and was involved in the establishment of various public health interventions.

== Present Day ==
Today, MSI primarily operates in Indonesia. Over its six-decade history, it has interacted with tens of thousands of people.
