= Kenya Institute of Social Work and Community Development =

- Motto: Empowering the Community for Sustainable Development
- Type: Private
- Established: 1997
- Affiliations: KNEC, ABMA UK, KASNEB, ICM, ICDL
- Director: Benjamin M. Mutie
- Academic staff: 40
- Students: 1300
- Location: Nairobi, Nairobi City County, Kenya; 1°17′13″S 36°50′15″E
- Campus: Urban, 25 acres (0.1 km^{2})
- Colors: Blue and white^{[a]}
- Mascot: Book
- Website: www.kiswcd.co.ke

The Kenya Institute of Social Work and Community Development (KISWCD) is a community-focused development and training institution without any governmental, religious or political affiliation. It was registered by the Ministry of Education, Science and Technology on 22 August 2002 as a training institution. In 2016; in line with the TVET Act 2013, the institution was assessed and licensed to operate by TVETA Registration TVETA/PRIVATE/TVC/0120/2016.

The institute is managed by a Board of Governors who are experienced in the areas of social work, educational institutions management, business management, human resources management, finance and accounting, psychology, environmental health, counselling and law.

KISWCD is an examination centre for Kenya National Examination Council, the Institute of Commercial Management, CDAAC, the Association of Business Managers and Administrators among others. The institution offers certificate and diploma courses in Community Development, Social Work and Welfare, Project Management, Community Health and Counseling. Short courses and consultancy services are available. Students from Uganda, Tanzania, Mozambique, Sudan, Somalia and Ethiopia are among those who have enrolled in KISWCD.

In the last 25 years, the institution has distinguished itself as a Centre of excellence; drawing students from virtually all major NGOs, Government departments and the Private sector. Foreign students from Uganda, Tanzania, Mozambique, Sudan, Somalia, Malawi and Ethiopia have continued to enroll in KISWCD signifying the confidence that the region has in the institution. Empowerment of the community through training and management is the basic foundation of the institute.

The main campus is located at Southern House, 2nd floor, off Moi Avenue opposite the Meridian Hotel, Nairobi.

== Academics ==
=== Intake ===
KISWCD has intakes in January, May and September every year. Registration for the distance learning programme is possible throughout the year. Students can register online.

=== Mode of study ===
- Full-time (daytime)- 8.00 am – 6.00 pm, Mon – Fri
- Evening classes – 5.30 pm – 7.30 pm, Mon – Fri
- Saturday classes – 8.00 am – 4.00 pm
- Blocks – April, August, and December
- Distant Learning Programme/Online /E- learning

=== Examinations ===
Examinations are administered by several examination bodies namely:

- Kenya National Examination Council (KNEC)
- Association of Business Managers and Administrators (ABMA UK)
- NITA
- CDAAC
- Institute of Commercial Management (ICM UK)

=== Field work attachment ===
All students are required to get attachments in NGOs, churches and other organizations involved in community work for not less than three months. This takes place during the academic year and is a mandatory requirement.

=== Extracurricular ===
The institute sponsors an annual sports day where students and teachers play against each other.

=== Short courses ===
Short courses are organized at the beginning of each year.

== Accommodation ==
KISWCD does not offer in-house accommodation for students. However, arrangements are made to secure safe accommodation, with the cost met by the students.

== Consultancy ==
The objective of the consultancy services is to provide advice in particular areas of expertise.
