= List of storms named Lillian =

The name Lillian or Lilian has been used for two tropical cyclones in the Eastern Pacific Ocean and one was used for a European windstorm.

-In the Eastern Pacific:

- Tropical Storm Lillian (1963) – made landfall on Western Mexico.
- Hurricane Lillian (1973) – remained over the open ocean.

-In Europe:

- Storm Lilian (2024)
