= Lillian Lewis =

Lillian Lewis may refer to:

- Lillian Lewis (actress) (1852–1899), American actress
- Lillian A. Lewis (b. 1861), American journalist
- Lillian Lewis Batchelor (1907–1977), American librarian
- Lillian Miles Lewis (1939–2012), American political adviser and wife of John Lewis
