= Lilian Prunet =

French ice hockey forward

- Born: February 15, 1978 (age 47); Megève, France
- Height: 5 ft 11 in (180 cm)
- Weight: 181 lb (82 kg; 12 st 13 lb)
- Position: Defence
- Shot: Left
- Played for: Club des Sports de Megève; Dragons de Rouen; Scorpions de Mulhouse; Yétis du Mont-Blanc
- National team: France
- Playing career: 1996–2012

Lilian Prunet (born February 15, 1978) is a French former professional ice hockey defenceman.

Prunet played in France's Ligue Magnus for Club des Sports de Megève, Hockey Club de Reims, Dragons de Rouen, Scorpions de Mulhouse and Yétis du Mont-Blanc. He also played in the 2004 IIHF World Championship for the France national team.
