= Lillian Cohen =

American inorganic chemist

- Born: June 19, 1878; Minneapolis, Minnesota, United States
- Died: June 5, 1949 (aged 70); Minneapolis, Minnesota, United States
- Education: University of Minnesota
- Scientific career
- Thesis: Equilibria in the Systems, Water, Acetone, and Inorganic Salts (1913)
- Doctoral advisor: George B. Frankforter

Lillian Cohen (June 19, 1878 – June 5, 1949) was an American inorganic chemist and chemistry professor at the University of Minnesota. She was the first woman to receive a doctorate in chemistry from the University of Minnesota and the first female member of its chemistry faculty.

== Life and career ==
Educated in the Minneapolis public schools, Cohen received her B.S. degree from the University of Minnesota in 1900, with a major in chemistry and a minor in physics. She received an M.S. the following year, probably under the supervision of Everhart Percy Harding (1870–1932), with whom she published a paper on the preparation of 2,5-dimethylbenzaldehyde in August 1901. After one year as a high school teacher, she returned to her alma mater as a chemistry instructor in 1902.

== Works ==
In August 1905, Cohen took a sabbatical year for postgraduate studies at the Eidgenössische Polytechnische Schule in Zürich (now the ETH Zurich). After returning to UMN, she began doctoral studies under George B. Frankforter and received her Ph.D. in 1913 with a thesis on "Equilibria in the Systems, Water, Acetone, and Inorganic Salts." She was promoted to assistant professor in 1918 and to associate professor in 1927. Cohen was an active member of Iota Sigma Pi and was elected Phi Beta Kappa and Sigma XI. She was also active in the Minnesota Section of the American Chemical Society.

A passionate chemistry educator, Cohen had a deep interest in her students' lives and careers outside the classroom, particularly those of her female students to whom she acted as a "counselor and advisor." In spite of her accomplishments, a letter she wrote in 1946 to university librarian and archivist E.W. McDiarmid suggested her strong resentment at the discrimination she had encountered. For instance, the dean of the chemistry department had requested her to write a departmental history, which had been little appreciated; as Cohen noted, "...President Ford said in effect, my story was not worthy of the sacred name 'History.' " Nor had any of her accompanying photos been returned to her, though both history and photos had been used by others as references. Cohen subsequently donated her files and reference materials to a waste paper drive during World War II, so by the time McDiarmid contacted her about donating her papers to the university, she replied, "So when I leave [the university], there will be just a pension with my name on the payroll to record my 44 happy years of teaching on the campus." She retired from UMN that year as an emerita associate professor; the next female chemistry professor at the university, Marian Stankovich, would be hired in 1980 following a sexual discrimination settlement.

Cohen died after a long illness on June 5, 1949.
