= Taiwan Blackfoot Disease Socio-Medical Service Memorial House =

Former clinic in Beimen, Tainan, Taiwan

- 台灣烏腳病醫療紀念館
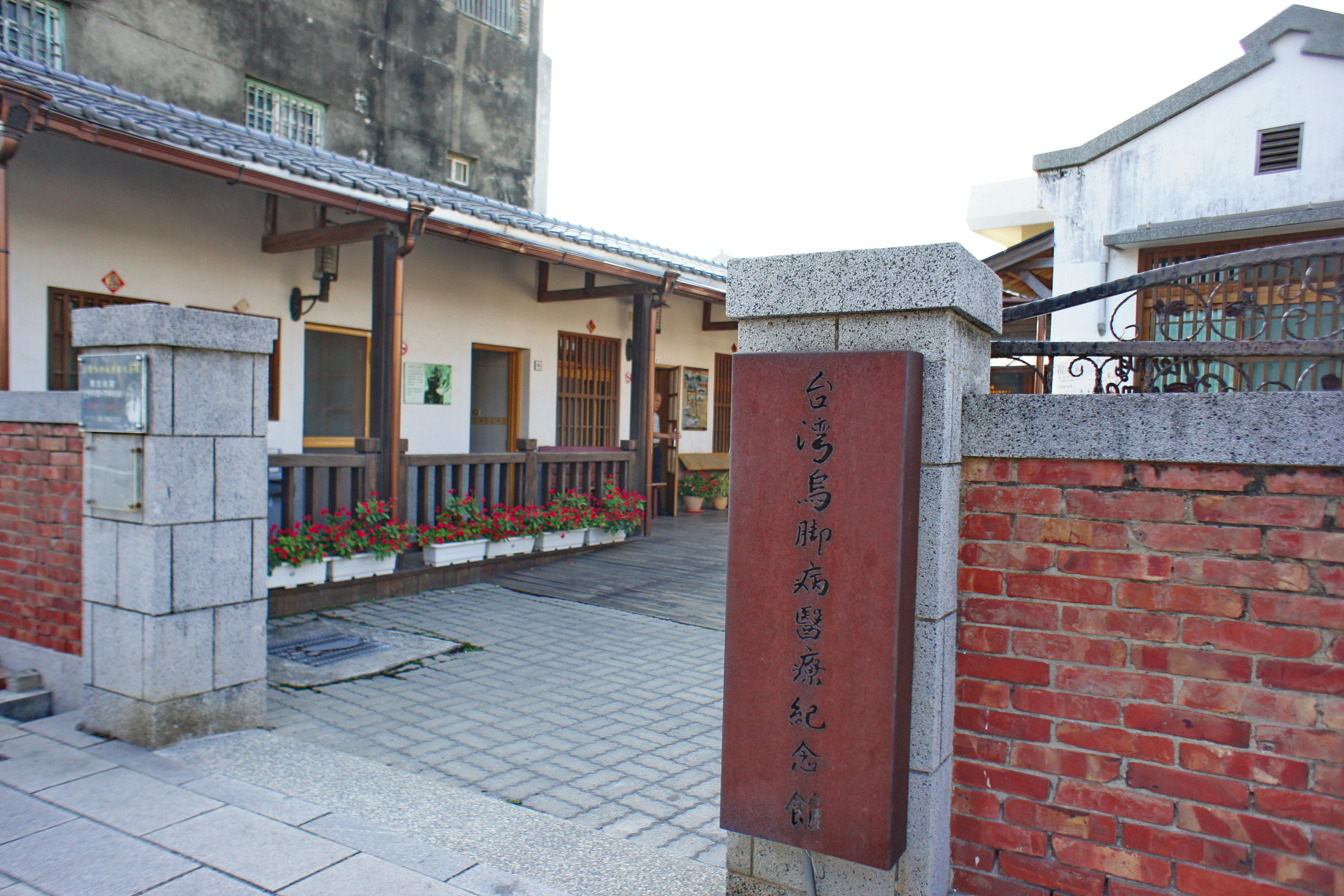
- Interactive map of the Taiwan Blackfoot Disease Socio-Medical Service Memorial House area

General information
- Type: former clinic
- Location: Beimen, Tainan, Taiwan
- Coordinates: 23°16′10″N 120°07′25″E
- Opened: September 2007
- Operator: Wang King-ho Culture and Arts Foundation

Website
- Official website

The Taiwan Blackfoot Disease Socio-Medical Service Memorial House (traditional Chinese: 台灣烏腳病醫療紀念館; simplified Chinese: 台湾乌脚病医疗纪念馆; pinyin: Táiwān Wūjiǎobìng Yīliáo Jìniànguǎn) is a former clinic building in Yonglong Village, Beimen District, Tainan, Taiwan.

== History ==
The memorial house used to be a clinic for Wang King-ho, a doctor who had fought the adverse effects of "blackfoot disease" (arsenic poisoning) for 25 years by offering free medical services to patients from Beimen and the surrounding regions. Tainan County Magistrate Su Huan-chih and Department of Cultural Affairs Commissioner Ye Tzer-shan then proposed for the reconstruction of the clinic into a memorial house to preserve the history of the disease in Taiwan. Construction began in November 2006 and ended in September 2007. It was then opened by President Chen Shui-bian in end of September of the same year. After inauguration, the memorial house was taken over by the Wang King-ho Culture and Arts Foundation.

== See also ==
- List of tourist attractions in Taiwan
