= Lillian Dickson =

American missionary

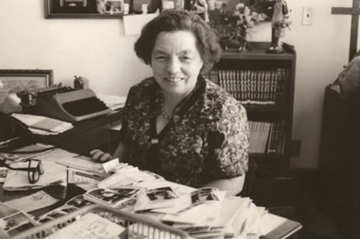
- Born: Lillian Ruth LeVesconte; January 29, 1901; Prior Lake, Minnesota
- Died: January 14, 1983 (aged 81); Taipei, Taiwan
- Other names: 孫理蓮 牧師娘, Typhoon Lil
- Education: Macalester College (BA)
- Occupations: Missionary; Humanitarian
- Years active: 1927-1983
- Organization: Mustard Seed International The Mustard Seed Mission
- Known for: Missionary work in Taiwan
- Board member of: The Mustard Seed, Inc., The Mustard Seed Mission (in Taiwan)
- Spouse: James Ira Dickson (m. 1928; died 1967) (b. February 23, 1900, d. June 15, 1967)
- Children: Ronald James Dickson, Marilyn Ruth (Dickson) Tank, Bi-lian “Mei-ling” Dickson

Lillian Dickson (29 January 1901 – 14 January 1983) was an independent missionary, author, and public speaker. She used her maternal identity to develop her vocation in the middle of the twentieth century. Originally, she and her husband, James Dickson (1900-1967), were sent by the Presbyterian Church of Canada, to Taiwan in 1927. Lillian lived and worked in Taiwan until she died, except for the period between 1940 and 1947 when she and her husband were transferred to British Guiana because of growing tensions and war between Japan and the United States. After her return to Taiwan, Lillian eventually developed a long lasting career as an independent missionary. In particular, she founded Mustard Seed International. and The Mustard Seed Mission (based in Taiwan).

== Early life ==
Dickson was born Lillian Ruth LeVesconte on January 29, 1901, in Prior Lake, Minnesota, to John, "a flour-and-feed-mill operator", and Lillie Belle LeVesconte. She met her husband, James Ira Dickson, during her time at Macalester College. On May 16, 1927, Dickson and James married. As both were members of the Canadian Presbyterian Church (CPC) and were interested in doing missionary work, the newly-wed Dicksons answered CPC's urgent call to provide pastoral and medical care to a CPC base in northern Taiwan.

== Education ==
At 23, Dickson received her Bachelor of Arts from Macalester College in St. Paul, Minnesota. A year after, Dickson attended a Biblical Seminary in New York City, New York for two years to prepare for pending missionary work. For her trip to Taiwan, Dickson planned to take medical courses in preparation to become the family doctor in the village they intended to live in Taiwan, as there was a lack of good medical care for lepers. However, Dickson reflected in her letters to her husband later during her missionary work in Taiwan, "Nothing I studied in college is of any use here,...All the things I should know I learn by painful mistakes! Who would have ever guessed our life would be like this?" (1997-5006-2-1; circular letter dated May 15, 1959).

== Missionary work ==
=== Work in Formosa before World War II ===
Dickson arrived in Taiwan in 1927 as a missionary under the Canadian Presbyterian Church. Lillian Dickson arrived as a participant in the Legacy of the American missionary movement. She lived through the Japanese colonial period and the Chinese nationalist era in Taiwan. During the Dicksons' first thirteen years in Formosa, now known as Taiwan, Dickson lived and worked as a missionary's wife. Her husband, James, served as deputy principal of Tamsui Middle School and then as president of Taipei Theological School. Dickson would host guests in their house and maintained the hospitable character of a missionary's wife. Due to rising tensions in World War II between Japan and the United States, the Dicksons left Taiwan and were reassigned to what is now British Guiana in South America.

=== Work in Taiwan after World War II ===
At the end of World War II, the Dicksons returned to Formosa. Lillian's husband continued his role as head administrator of the Taiwan Theological College. As Lillian's children were older, Lillian no longer held much obligations as missionary's wife. Dickson became a spokesperson for both Taiwan and the U.S., promoting peace and positive Japanese relations. Beyond that, Dickson advocated for the welfare of the needy Taiwanese people through an exchange of information and images in her letters she would write to her family, friends, and Churches in the US. By highlighting the needs of the Taiwanese people, she encouraged American organizations to donate to the people of Formosa. Christian organizations most helpful to Dickson at the time included the Christian Herald, a New York-based news organization, and World Vision, a charitable foundation created to rescue orphans after the Korean War. After repeated encouragement from her friends, Lillian Dickson established the non-profit Mustard Seed, Inc. organization in order for her donors to apply for tax deductions in 1954 and founded The Mustard Seed Mission to continue her work in Taiwan in 1962.

As we left, the young girls of the village chanted a fare well song. Their voices had the high, light, sweet taut timbre of violin strains, something like the sighing of the winds through the treetops."Why didn't you come before? Will you come back again?" Their questions seemed to haunt us as much as the mute appeal in their eyes and even before we had returned to our side of the mountains, we were making plans to return again to the mountains to shepherd our people in the hills.

— Lillian Dickson, These My People

=== Medical missionary work ===
Upon Dickson's return to Taiwan, her intent was to evangelize the Taiwanese children. However, it was her medical missions that attracted her American donors. While she was not herself a licensed medical professional, Dickson's organization provided medical care and promoted hygiene through several missions executed over her lifetime. Some examples of missions included: developing mountain clinics, building a church in a leper colony, and establishing a blackfoot disease clinic.

Lillian Dickson's medical missionary work started with her focus on the leper patients and their children in the leper hospitals. When the children remained with their parents who were affected by leprosy, it was evident the children were at high risk of contracting the disease. Dickson found that when the children were separated at birth from their parents and were permitted to grow healthy. Hence, Dickson established a An-Lok Babies' Home to house the newborn babies with parents who had leprosy.

From then on, Lillian Dickson went to create expansive leper colonies, and other clinics that focused on other diseases affected by the aboriginal people of Formosa. In 1955, the leprosarium Lillian Dickson served had over 800 patients alone.

Dickson served as nurse, medical educator and religious missionary. When she traveled to the mountain clinics, she would bring medicine and provide medical care for the indigenous Taiwanese Tayal people who came from all parts of the mountain. She would treat medical sores, infections, cases of pneumonia and bronchitis, scabies, along with other ailments. Dickson would also teach the nurses at the clinics how to provide the specific treatments needed. Beyond that, as Dickson treated patients, she would recount biblical stories and sing loving gospels to the patients, which she claimed the indigenous people of the mountain would, "answer with warm, impetuous friendship."

=== Additional missionary work ===
Beyond her medical care, Lillian Dickson's The Mustard Seed Mission in Taiwan included other branches that served the citizens of Taiwan. During her time, Dickson developed a Boy's Home for young boys were caught for committing petty crimes. Dickson also helped parents who had children out of wedlock which were marked on their certificates of identification. Due to the social stigma against these kinds of families, children were considered illegitimate and denied access to school and the parents had difficulty finding work. Dickson helped the parents find work and the children gain access to schools.

== Criticism of Communism ==
Dickson was firmly against communism. Taiwan was introduced in the United States as "Free China," or a place to combat Communism and the best location to preach the Christian faith in Asia. She is quoted in Angel at Her Shoulder saying "a wealthy America should rescue a poverty-stricken free China to combat their shared enemy of Communism" along with efforts against burdens of disease. Her autobiography These My People states that "sometimes we forget our threatening enemy, forget that the fiery dart of communism is aimed at our hearts." Throughout her personal writings, she expressed anxiety over the system of government in relation to her missionary work. In fact, she proposed friendly relationships between the United States and Japan to defeat communism as a common enemy.

== Legacy ==
Dickson founded the interdenominational Mustard Seed International (MSI) and The Mustard Seed Mission (MSM) to support her missionary work, which included caring for orphans in Formosa. She founded several orphanages and children's homes, describing herself as "the old woman who lived in a shoe—only I've got more shoes." She helped establish MSI-sponsored kindergartens, elementary, middle and high schools. Furthermore, her work has led to Bible college and seminary training for pastors, lay leaders and church planting teams, and medical care in clinics and hospitals. Dickson continued to return to the U.S. for speaking tours until 1978, and consistently recruited support by discussing the tremendous needs of Taiwan through interviews on television and through other media.

== Children ==
She had a total of 4 children, two of whom lived. She adopted a fifth.

- Unnamed son - Sep 1928 (stillbirth)
- Jeanna Naome - (Jul - Aug 1929)
- Ronald James Dickson (1930 - 1982)
- Marilyn Ruth (Dickson) Tank (1932 - )
- Bi-lian “Mei-ling” Dickson - adopted in Formosa c. 1950s

== Death ==
Dickson died in Taipei, Taiwan on January 14, 1983, at the age of 81, of natural causes.

== Bibliography ==
- Dickson, Lillian (1958). These My People: Serving Christ Among the Mountain People of Formosa. ISBN 0548386838.
- Dickson, Lillian (1977). Marilyn Dickson Tank (ed.). Chuckles Behind the Door: Lillian Dickson's Personal Letters. S.l. : s.n. OCLC 3608088.

== Works about ==
- Wilson, Kenneth Lee (1964). Angel at her shoulder. New York: Harper & Row.
- Brosius, Shirley (2006). "April 1". Sisterhood of faith : 365 life-changing stories about women who made a difference. New York: Howard Books. p. 96. ISBN 158229576X.
