= List of county roads in Kandiyohi County, Minnesota =

Highway names
- Interstates: Interstate X (I-X)
- US Highways: U.S. Highway X (US X)
- State: Trunk Highway X (MN X or TH X)
- County State-Aid Highways: County State-Aid Highway X (CSAH X)
- County Roads: County Road X (CR X)

System links
- County roads of Minnesota; Kandiyohi County

The following is a list of county-maintained highways in Kandiyohi County, Minnesota, United States. Some of the routes in this list are also County State-Aid Highways (CSAH.)

== Route list ==
Number	Length (mi)	Length (km)	Southern or western terminus	Northern or eastern terminus	Local names	Formed	Removed	Notes
CSAH 1	—	—	Renville County Line (County 21)	Pope County Line (County 18)	105th Street SW; 6th Street; 105th Street SW; 1st Street S; 1st Street N	—	—	
CSAH 3	—	—	135th Street SW (County 7) in Edwards Township	County 8 in Fahlun Township	120th Avenue SW; 120th Avenue SE; 53rd Street SE; 71st Avenue SE	—	—	
CSAH 5	—	—	Renville County Line (County 1)	County 1 in Colfax Township	30th Street SW; 278th Avenue NW	—	—	
CSAH 7	—	—	Renville County Township (County 6)	MN 9 in Sunburg	135th Street SW; 8th Street; 3rd Avenue E; Cofield Street S; Cofield Street N; 142nd Street SW; 135th Street SW; 135th Street NW; 140th Street NW; Central Avenue	—	—	
CSAH 12	—	—	Chippewa County Line (County 13)	Cofield Street N (County 7) in Raymond	Spicer Avenue	—	—	
CSAH 13	—	—	Swift County Line (County 6)	135th Street NW (County 7) in Mamre Township	75th Avenue NW	—	—	
CR 14	—	—	Chippewa County Line (County 17)	135th Street SW (County 7) in Holland Township	225th Avenue SW	—	—	
CSAH 27	—	—	135th Street NW (County 7) in Mamre Township	County 9 in Green Lake Township	172nd Avenue NE; 141st Street NE; 176th Avenue NE	—	—	
CSAH 29	—	—	County 1 in Arctander Township	US 71 in New London Township		—	—	
CR 29	—	—	Swift County Line (County 12)	County 1 in Arctander Township		—	—	
CSAH 36	—	—	MN 9 in Sunburg	Pope County Line (County 37)	140th Street NW; 133rd Street NW; 285 Avenue NW; 91st Street NW	—	—	
CSAH 40	—	—	Swift County Line (County 18)	160th Street NE (County 2) in Irving Township	172nd Avenue NE; 141st Street NE; 176th Avenue NE	—	—	
CSAH 42	—	—	Chippewa County Line	County 7 in Edwards Township	172nd Avenue NE; 141st Street NE; 176th Avenue NE	—	—	
CR 42	—	—	County 42 in Edwards Township	60th Avenue SW in Edwards Township		—	—	
CSAH 50	—	—	Roseland Avenue in Prinsburg	6th Street (County 1) in Prinsburg	3rd Street; Railroad Avenue	—	—	
CSAH 53	—	—	Cofield Street N (County 7) in Raymond	Cofield Street N (County 7) in Raymond	Spicer Avenue; Day Street; Menage Avenue	—	—	
CSAH 54	—	—	2nd Street NW in Pennock	2nd Street NE in Pennock	Atlantic Avenue NW; Atlantic Avenue NE	—	—	
CSAH 60	—	—	Shortline Avenue in Sunburg	Central Avenue (County 7) in Sunburg	Front Street	—	—	
CR 65	—	—	60th Street NW in St. Johns Township	US 12 in Mamre Township		—	—	
CR 70	—	—	15th Street SE (County 122) in Roseland Township	30th Street SE in Roseland Township	Kandi-Renville Line Road SE	—	—	
CR 75	—	—	135th Street SW (County 7) in Holland Township	County 5 in Roseland Township	225th Avenue SW	—	—	
CR 78	—	—	US 71 in Roseland Township	45th Street SE (County 44) in Lake Lillian Township	210th Avenue SE	—	—	
CR 80	—	—	Chippewa County Line	US 71 in Roseland Township	165th Avenue SW	—	—	
CR 85	—	—	75th Street SW (County 116) in Edwards Township	US 71 in Whitefield Township	75th Avenue SW	—	—	
CR 87	—	—	County 1 in St. Johns Township	County 116 in St. Johns Township	45th Avenue SW	—	—	
CR 89	—	—	County 11 in Mamre Township	75th Street NW (County 116) in Mamre Township	30th Avenue NW	—	—	
CR 92	—	—	75th Street NW (County 116) in Mamre Township	30th Street NE (County 5) in Dovre Township	45th Avenue NW; 64th Street NW; 41st Avenue NW; 45th Street NW; 37th Avenue NW	—	—	
CR 94	—	—	Swift County Line	135th Street NE (County 7) in Mamre Township		—	—	
CR 101	—	—	165th Avenue NW in Arctander Township	County 40 in Arctander Township	68th Street NW	—	—	
CR 111	—	—	Continuation into Raymond	135th Street SW (County 7) in Edwards Township	142nd Street SW; 120th Avenue SW	—	—	
CSAH 112	—	—	County 7 in Sunburg	221st Avenue NW (County 112) in Norway Lake Township	225th Avenue NW; 125th Street NW	—	—	
CR 112	—	—	125th Street NW (County 112) in Norway Lake Township	110th Street NW (County 113) in Norway Lake Township	221st Avenue NW	—	—	
CR 113	—	—	135th Avenue NW (County 29) in Arctander Township	MN 9 in Norway Lake Township	118th Street NW; 165th Avenue NW; 110th Street NW	—	—	
CR 115	—	—	MN 9 in Norway Lake Township	County 36 in Norway Lake Township	95th Street NW; 91st Street NW	—	—	
CSAH 116	—	—	Continuation past Willmar Wastewater Treatment Plant	MN 40 in St. Johns Township		—	—	Southern Segment
CSAH 116	—	—	7th Avenue NW in St. Johns Township	30th Avenue NW (County 89) in Mamre Township		—	—	Northern Segment
CR 116	—	—	Kandi-Renville Line Road SW in Holland Township	Continuation past Willmar Wastewater Treatment Plant	75th Street SW	—	—	Southern Segment
CR 116	—	—	MN 40 in St. Johns Township	7th Avenue NW in St. Johns Township		—	—	Central Segment
CR 116	—	—	30th Avenue NW (County 89) in Mamre Township	County 27 in Mamre Township	75th Street NW	—	—	Northern Segment
CR 122	—	—	Kandi-Renville Line Road (County 70) in Roseland Township	MN 7 in Roseland Township	172nd Avenue NE; 141st Street NE; 176th Avenue NE	—	—	
Former
