= Terrace Mill =

- Terrace Mill Historic District
- U.S. National Register of Historic Places
- U.S. Historic district – Contributing property
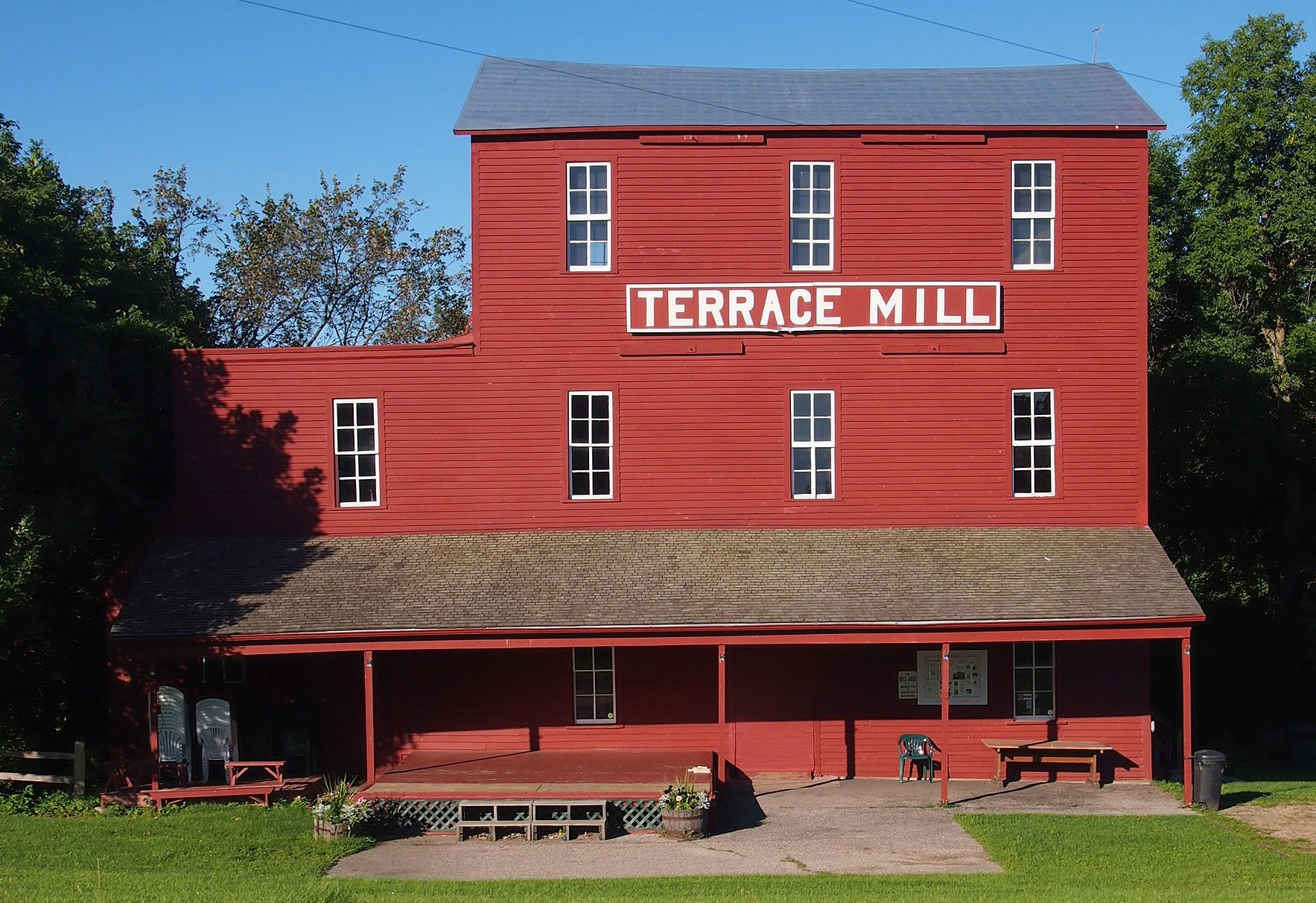
- The Terrace Mill from the east-northeast

- Location within Minnesota Location within the United States
- Location: Off Minnesota Highway 104, Chippewa Falls Township, Minnesota
- Nearest city: Sedan, Minnesota
- Coordinates: 45°30′39″N 95°19′15″W
- Area: 3.8 acres (1.5 ha)
- Built: 1882, 1903, 1915, 1930
- Architect: Jonas M. Danelz (mill, bridge), Peter Takken (house)
- Part of: Terrace Historic District (ID82002999)
- NRHP reference No.: 79001252
- Added to NRHP: July 17, 1979

The Terrace Mill is a historic watermill in Terrace, Minnesota, United States, now operated as a museum. Managed by the non-profit Terrace Mill Foundation, the mill contains a gallery, theatre, and gift shop, while the grounds host outdoor events. The mill and four associated structures are listed on the National Register of Historic Places as the Terrace Mill Historic District for having local significance in commerce, engineering, industry, and transportation.

== History ==
The first flour mill on the site was built in 1870 and operated into the mid-1890s, when it was moved to nearby Brooten, Minnesota, to be closer to a new rail line. Jonas M. Danelz bought the property in 1901 and constructed the current mill two years later. In 1920 it was purchased by Peter Takken, who installed a diesel engine in the mill and built a house for himself in 1930. Takken ceased grist milling operations in 1949 and the new owner converted the mill into a woodworking shop specializing in church furniture, operating until 1967. Terrace Mill stood vacant for several years. Preservation efforts began in the mid-1970s, and the Terrace Mill Foundation formed in 1979.

== Terrace Mill Historic District ==
The Terrace Mill Historic District consists of the 1903 mill, 1903 Stone Arch Bridge, 1915 Steel Beam Highway Bridge, Mill Dam possibly dating to 1882, and 1930 Miller's House. The historic district is significant for exemplifying the small, rural milling operations once common in Minnesota, particularly for retaining all the elements of a water-powered milling complex. Further significance derives from the fact that the complex is on the site of Pope County's first flour mill, built in 1870, and the existing mill was a major contributor to the local economy up until the 1960s. The mill itself bears significance because its construction and turbine engineering exemplify the era's small watermills, and it is one of only about two dozen surviving examples in Minnesota outside of Minneapolis–Saint Paul.

All five contributing properties of the Terrace Mill Historic District are also contributing properties to the larger Terrace Historic District.

The Terrace Mill Foundation has moved other historical buildings onto the mill grounds which are not considered contributing properties to the National Register district. These include a log cabin that was one of Terrace's first houses, reconstructed in the early 1980s, and a 1950s "heritage cottage" with Scandinavian construction and furnishings.

== Gallery ==
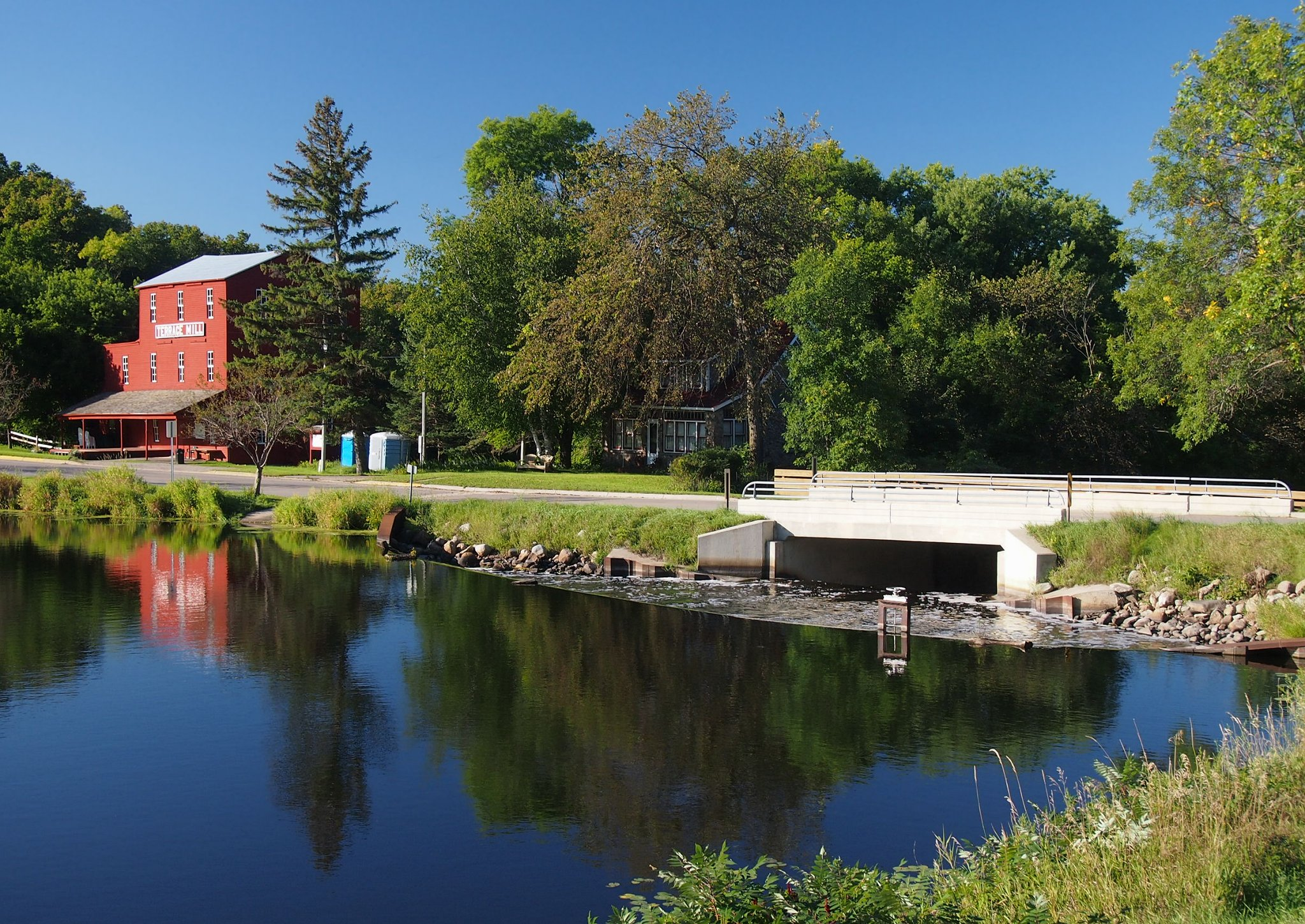
Terrace Mill Historic District from the north

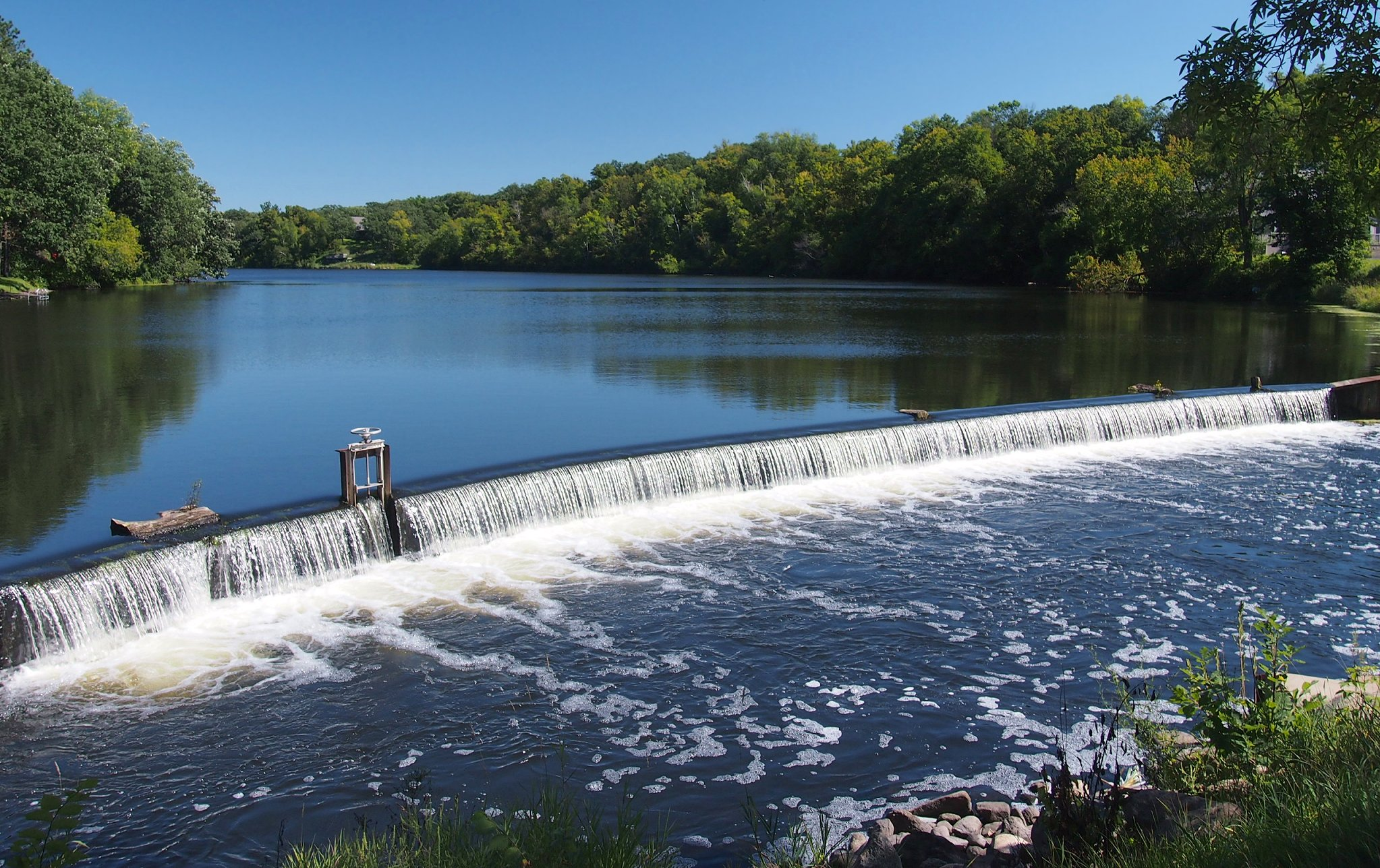
Mill Dam from the west

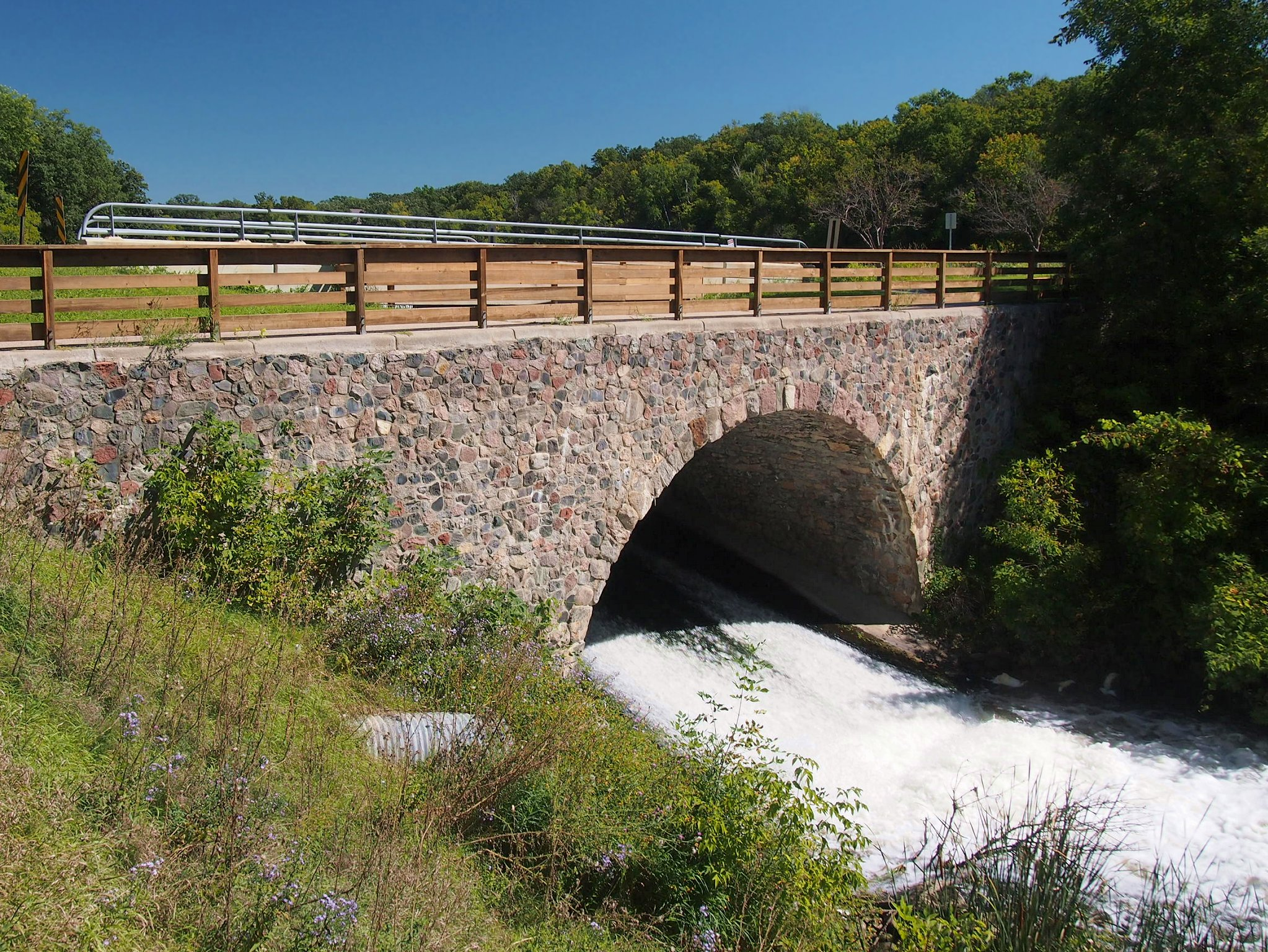
Stone Arch Bridge from the northwest

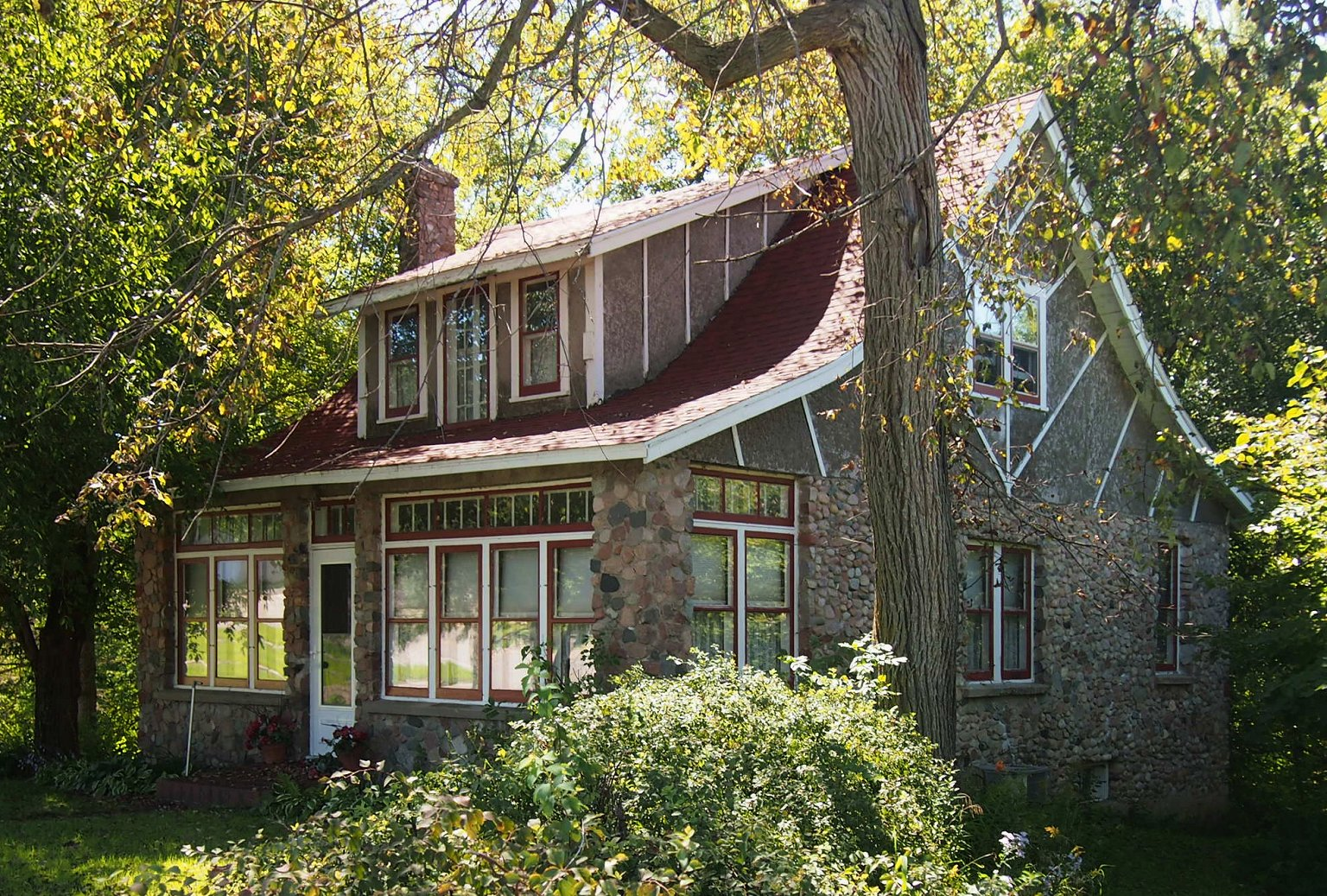
Peter Takken House from the northeast

== See also ==
- List of watermills in the United States
- National Register of Historic Places listings in Pope County, Minnesota
