= Norway Lake =

Norway Lake may refer to:

- Norway Lake (Cass County, Minnesota), a lake in Minnesota
- Norway Lake (Kandiyohi County, Minnesota), a lake in Minnesota
- Norway Lake, Minnesota, an unincorporated community
- Norway Lake (Rainy Creek drainage basin), Ontario, Canada
- Norway Lake Township (disambiguation), multiple civil townships
