= Minnesota State Highway 104 =

State highway in Minnesota, United States

Trunk Highway 104
- MN 104 highlighted in red

Route information
- Maintained by MnDOT
- Length: 27.320 mi (43.967 km)
- Existed: April 22, 1933–present

Major junctions
- South end: MN 9 at Norway Lake Township, near Sunburg
- North end: MN 28 / MN 29 at Glenwood

Location
- Country: United States
- State: Minnesota
- Counties: Kandiyohi, Swift, Pope

Highway system
- Minnesota Trunk Highway System; Interstate; US; State; Legislative; Scenic
← MN 102	→ MN 105

Minnesota State Highway 104 (MN 104) is a 27.320-mile-long (43.967 km) highway in west-central Minnesota, which runs from its intersection with State Highway 9 in Norway Lake Township near Sunburg and continues north to its northern terminus at its intersection with State Highways 28 and 29 in the city of Glenwood.

== Route description ==
State Highway 104 serves as a north–south and an east–west route between Sunburg and Glenwood in west-central Minnesota.

Highway 104 changes direction to east–west in Chippewa Falls Township and continues as east–west for 6 miles before returning again to a north–south direction in Barsness Township for the remainder of its route to Glenwood.

The highway is officially marked as a north–south route by its highway shields from beginning to end.

The route serves as the county line in northwest Kandiyohi County and northeast Swift County.

Highway 104 is also known as Franklin Street South in the city of Glenwood.

Monson Lake State Park is located west of Sunburg and west of the junction of Highway 104 and State Highway 9. The park entrance is located off Highway 9 via County Road 95.

The route is legally defined as Route 143 in the Minnesota Statutes. It is not marked with this number.

== History ==
State Highway 104 was authorized on April 22, 1933.

The route was completely paved by 1960.

From 1934 until 2005, State Highway 104 had continued farther south. The section of present-day Kandiyohi County State-Aid Highway 7 between State Highway 9 (at Sunburg) and U.S. Highway 12 (west of Pennock and Willmar) was originally designated Highway 104 until 2005. The original length of 104 was 41 miles.

== Major intersections ==
County	Location	mi	km	Destinations	Notes
Kandiyohi	Mamre Township	0.000	0.000	US 12	Programmed mile 0; former southern terminus
Kandiyohi	Sunburg	13.583	21.860	MN 9 east – New London	Former eastern end of MN 9 overlap
Swift–Kandiyohi county line	Kerkhoven–Norway Lake township line	14.446	23.249	MN 9 west – Sunburg, Benson	Current southern terminus; former western end of MN 9 overlap
Pope	Gilchrist–Lake Johanna township line	18.952	30.500	335th Street / Glacial Ridge Trail Scenic Byway	Southern end of Glacial Ridge Trail overlap
Pope	Gilchrist–Lake Johanna township line	23.416	37.684	CSAH 8 west – Gilchrist	Southern end of CSAH 8 overlap
Pope	Gilchrist–Lake Johanna township line	23.912	38.483	CSAH 8 east – Brooten	Northern end of CSAH 8 overlap
Pope	Chippewa Falls Township	24.959	40.168	CSAH 29 north – Sedan	
Pope	Barsness Township	31.598	50.852	CSAH 19 south / Glacial Ridge Trail Scenic Byway – Swift Falls	Glacial Ridge Trail Swift Falls spur
Pope	Glenwood Township	36.309	58.434	CSAH 18 / Glacial Ridge Trail Scenic Byway	Northern end of Glacial Ridge Trail overlap
Pope	Glenwood	40.891	65.808	MN 28 / MN 29 – Morris, Sauk Centre, Alexandria	
1.000 mi = 1.609 km; 1.000 km = 0.621 mi: Closed/former; Concurrency terminus
