= Terrace, Minnesota =

- Terrace Historic District
- U.S. National Register of Historic Places
- U.S. Historic district
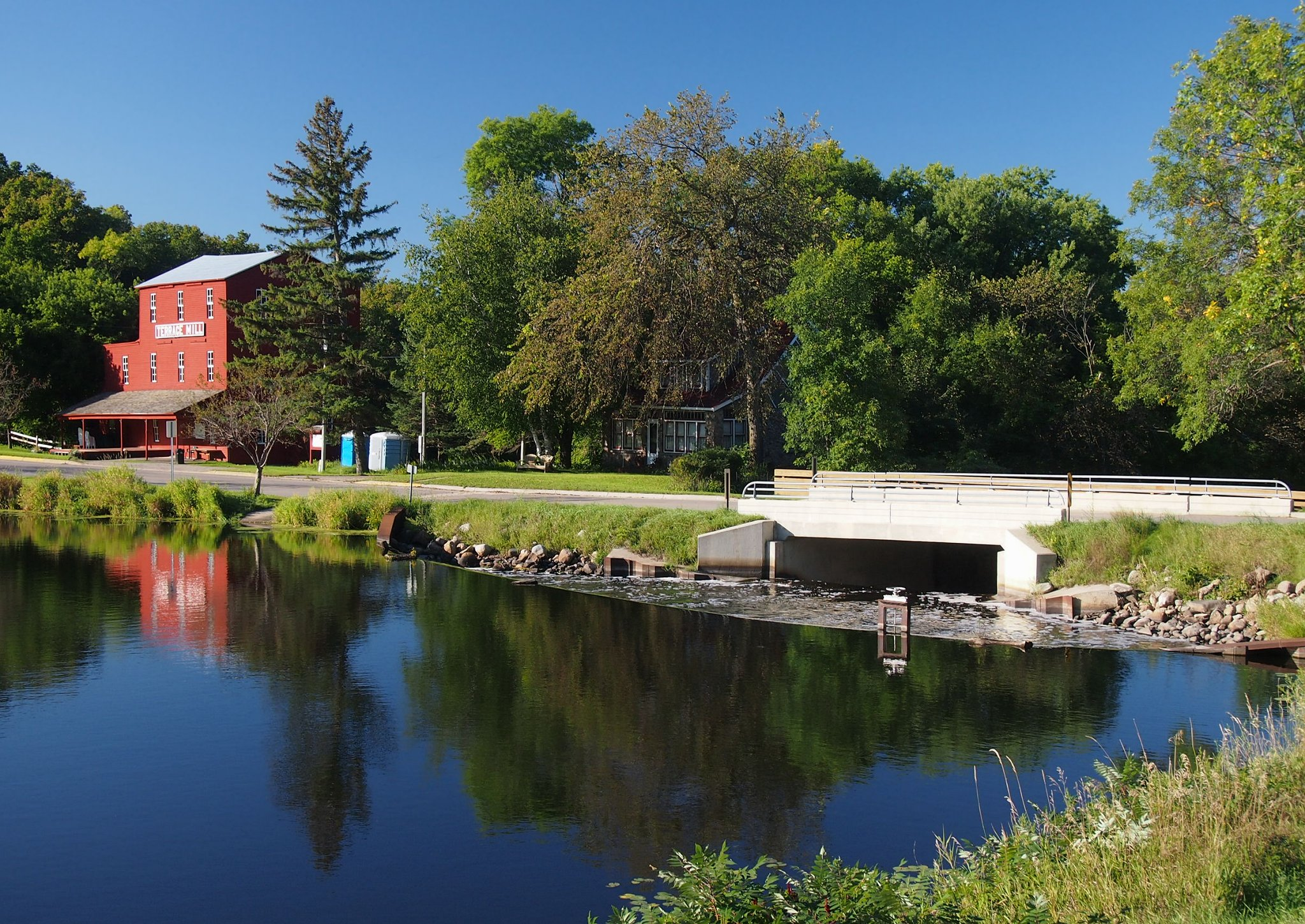
- Terrace's historic Terrace Mill and millpond

- Location within Minnesota Location within the United States
- Location: Off State Highway 104, Chippewa Falls Township, Minnesota
- Nearest city: Sedan, Minnesota
- Coordinates: 45°30′42″N 95°19′16″W
- Area: 42 acres (17 ha)
- Built: 1870s–1930
- NRHP reference No.: 82002999
- Added to NRHP: April 1, 1982

Terrace is an unincorporated community in Chippewa Falls Township, Pope County, Minnesota, United States. The community was settled in the 1870s around the Terrace Mill. In 1982, a historic district of early buildings and structures was listed on the National Register of Historic Places as the Terrace Historic District for having local significance under the themes of exploration/settlement and industry. It was nominated as a well-preserved example of the small communities that grew up around Minnesota's rural mills in the latter 19th century.

== History ==
Terrace was established by George Wheeler, John Wheeler, and William Moses; settlers who had moved from eastern Canada to Owatonna, Minnesota, to the Minnesota frontier to establish a mill. Located on the East Branch of the Chippewa River, the town was originally called Chippewa Falls, but soon changed names due to ongoing confusion with Chippewa Falls, Wisconsin. The original mill relocated to Brooten circa 1895, but in 1903 a new miller constructed the existing Terrace Mill and resumed the town's founding industry.

== Historic district ==
The Terrace Historic District consists of 13 contributing properties. Five contributing properties closely associated with the mill itself were originally listed on the National Register as the Terrace Mill Historic District in 1979, but a more comprehensive historic district was declared in 1982 in recognition of the rare integrity of the broader community. Early rural mill towns tended to be abandoned due to the cessation of small milling operations and competition from towns prospering along railroad lines. They are particularly rare in western Minnesota, where settlement was minimal until rail lines were laid. The properties of the Terrace Historic District represent the full suite of industrial, commercial, educational, social, religious, and residential structures comprising a small community.

Contributing property	Image	Location	Built	Summary
George Wheeler House		1st Street; 45°30′36″N 95°19′2.7″W	1873	Two-story frame house expanded by Wheeler with several additions to the rear
John Wheeler–William Moses House		1st Street; 45°30′36″N 95°19′5″W	c. 1873	Two-story frame house with early rear addition
Coburn Hotel		SE corner Co. Hwy. 21 & 1st St. 45°30′33.8″N 95°19′11.3″W	1877	One-and-a-half-story frame hotel with later west addition
House		1st Street; 45°30′34″N 95°19′9″W	c. 1870s	One-and-a-half-story frame house with later west addition
Foulds–Skinner House		1st Street; 45°30′34″N 95°19′5.7″W	c. 1880	One-and-a-half-story frame house with early east addition and second floor
Miller's House/Peter Takken House		County Highway 21; 45°30′40.1″N 95°19′15.8″W	1930	One-and-a-half-story fieldstone bungalow
Terrace Flour Mill		County Highway 21; 45°30′39″N 95°19′15″W	1903	Three-story frame watermill
Steel Beam Highway Bridge		County Highway 21; 45°30′41.2″N 95°19′15.4″W	1915	Steel beam bridge, remodeled in 1940
Mill Dam		Off County Highway 21; 45°30′41.5″N 95°19′14.8″W	c. 1882	Fieldstone dam
Stone Arch Bridge		County Highway 21 over the Chippewa River; 45°30′41″N 95°19′15.7″W	1903	30-foot (9.1 m) stone arch bridge
Skinner Drug Store (Terrace General Store)		County Highway 21; 45°30′38.9″N 95°19′11.8″W	c. 1882	Two-story frame commercial building with false front. Originally built in north part of town and moved in 1940 to the site of an 1871 store that had recently burned down.
Chippewa Falls Lutheran Church		County Highway 23; 45°30′46.8″N 95°19′5″W	1886	Carpenter Gothic church with 1924 façade and steeple and 1949 rear addition
School/Chippewa Falls Town Hall		County Highway 23; 45°30′46.7″N 95°19′7.7″W	1906	One-story frame building with open bell tower

== See also ==
- National Register of Historic Places listings in Pope County, Minnesota
