= Edwards Township =

Edwards Township may refer to the following places in the United States:

- Edwards Township, Michigan
- Edwards Township, Kandiyohi County, Minnesota
