= Norway Township, Minnesota =

Norway Township is the name of these civil townships in the U.S. state of Minnesota:

- Norway Township, Fillmore County, Minnesota
- Norway Township, Kittson County, Minnesota

== See also ==
- Norway Township (disambiguation)
