= Norway Township =

Norway Township may refer to the following places in the United States:

- Norway Township, Humboldt County, Iowa
- Norway Township, Winnebago County, Iowa
- Norway Township, Wright County, Iowa, Wright County, Iowa
- Norway Township, Republic County, Kansas
- Norway Township, Michigan
- Norway Township, Fillmore County, Minnesota
- Norway Township, Kittson County, Minnesota
- Norway Township, Traill County, North Dakota Traill County, North Dakota
- West Norway Township, Wells County, North Dakota, Wells County, North Dakota
- Norway Township, Clay County, South Dakota, Clay County, South Dakota
- Norway Township, Lincoln County, South Dakota, Lincoln County, South Dakota
- Norway Township, Roberts County, South Dakota, Roberts County, South Dakota
- Norway Township, Turner County, South Dakota, Turner County, South Dakota

== See also ==
- Norway Lake Township (disambiguation)
- Norway (disambiguation)
