= Holland Township, Minnesota =

- Township
- Location within Minnesota and the United States Holland Township (the United States)
- Coordinates: 44°55′29″N 95°11′38″W
- Country: United States
- State: Minnesota
- County: Kandiyohi

Area
  - Total: 35.4 sq mi (91.6 km^{2})
  - Land: 35.4 sq mi (91.6 km^{2})
  - Water: 0 sq mi (0.0 km^{2})
- Elevation: 1,079 ft (329 m)

Population (2000)
  - Total: 369
  - Density: 10/sq mi (4/km^{2})
- Time zone: UTC-6 (Central (CST))
  - Summer (DST): UTC-5 (CDT)
- FIPS code: 27-29600
- GNIS feature ID: 0664497
- Website: https://www.hollandtownshipmn.org/

Holland Township is a township in Kandiyohi County, Minnesota, United States. The population was 369 at the 2000 census.

Holland Township was organized in 1888. A large share of the early settlers being natives of Holland caused the name to be selected.

== Geography ==
According to the United States Census Bureau, the township has a total area of 35.4 square miles (92 km^{2}), of which 35.3 square miles (91 km^{2}) of land and 0.03% is water.

== Demographics ==
As of the census of 2000, there were 369 people, 120 households, and 102 families residing in the township. The population density was 10.4 inhabitants per square mile (4.0/km^{2}). There were 122 housing units at an average density of 3.5 per square mile (1.4/km^{2}). The racial makeup of the township was 98.37% White, 0.27% African American, 1.08% from other races, and 0.27% from two or more races. Hispanic or Latino of any race were 1.08% of the population.

There were 120 households, out of which 47.5% had children under the age of 18 living with them, 84.2% were married couples living together, and 15.0% were non-families. 11.7% of all households were made up of individuals, and 1.7% had someone living alone who was 65 years of age or older. The average household size was 3.08 and the average family size was 3.40.

In the township the population was spread out, with 33.9% under the age of 18, 3.8% from 18 to 24, 30.4% from 25 to 44, 22.8% from 45 to 64, and 9.2% who were 65 years of age or older. The median age was 34 years. For every 100 females, there were 105.0 males. For every 100 females age 18 and over, there were 114.0 males.

The median income for a household in the township was $45,313, and the median income for a family was $46,875. Males had a median income of $30,750 versus $19,107 for females. The per capita income for the township was $16,243. About 7.1% of families and 7.0% of the population were below the poverty line, including 7.6% of those under age 18 and none of those age 65 or over.
