= Sunburg, Minnesota =

City in Minnesota, United States

- City
- Location of Sunburg, Minnesota
- Coordinates: 45°20′51″N 95°14′24″W
- Country: United States
- State: Minnesota
- County: Kandiyohi
- Incorporated: September 8, 1951

Government
  - Mayor: Wayne Rudningen

Area
  - Total: 0.502 sq mi (1.299 km^{2})
  - Land: 0.473 sq mi (1.226 km^{2})
  - Water: 0.028 sq mi (0.073 km^{2})
- Elevation: 1,250 ft (381 m)

Population (2020)
  - Total: 94
  - Estimate (2022): 94
  - Density: 198.5/sq mi (76.65/km^{2})
- Time zone: UTC−6 (Central (CST))
  - Summer (DST): UTC−5 (CDT)
- ZIP Code: 56289
- Area code: 320
- FIPS code: 27-63454
- GNIS feature ID: 2396005
- Sales tax: 7.375%

Sunburg is a city in Kandiyohi County, Minnesota, United States. The population was 94 at the 2020 census.

== Geography ==
According to the United States Census Bureau, the city has a total area of 0.502 square miles (1.30 km^{2}), of which 0.474 square miles (1.23 km^{2}) is land and 0.028 square miles (0.07 km^{2}) is water.

Minnesota State Highways 9 and 104 are two of the main routes in the community.

Monson Lake State Park is just west of the town.

== Demographics ==
Historical population
Census	Pop.	Note	%±
1960	161		—
1970	144		−10.6%
1980	130		−9.7%
1990	117		−10.0%
2000	110		−6.0%
2010	100		−9.1%
2020	94		−6.0%
2022 (est.)	94		0.0%
U.S. Decennial Census; 2020 Census

=== 2010 census ===
As of the 2010 census there were 100 people, 47 households and 25 families residing in the city. The population density was 212.8 inhabitants per square mile (82.2/km^{2}). There were 57 housing units at an average density of 121.3 per square mile (46.8/km^{2}). The racial makeup of the city was 99.0% White and 1.0% from two or more races.

There were 47 households, of which 25.5% had children under the age of 18 living with them, 42.6% were married couples living together, 2.1% had a female householder with no husband present, 8.5% had a male householder with no wife present, and 46.8% were non-families. 46.8% of all households were made up of individuals, and 29.8% had someone living alone who was 65 years of age or older. The average household size was 2.13 and the average family size was 3.12.

The median age in the city was 43 years. 24% of residents were under the age of 18; 4% were between the ages of 18 and 24; 27% were from 25 to 44; 22% were from 45 to 64; and 23% were 65 years of age or older. The gender makeup of the city was 61.0% male and 39.0% female.

=== 2000 census ===
As of the 2000 census, there were 110 people, 51 households and 32 families residing in the city. The population density was 227.9 inhabitants per square mile (88.0/km^{2}). There were 55 housing units at an average density of 114.0 per square mile (44.0/km^{2}). The racial makeup of the city was 100.00% White.

There were 51 households, of which 17.6% had children under the age of 18 living with them, 49.0% were married couples living together, 5.9% had a female householder with no husband present, and 35.3% were non-families. 31.4% of all households were made up of individuals, and 11.8% had someone living alone who was 65 years of age or older. The average household size was 2.16 and the average family size was 2.73.

15.5% of the population were under the age of 18, 8.2% from 18 to 24, 28.2% from 25 to 44, 21.8% from 45 to 64, and 26.4% who were 65 years of age or older. The median age was 44 years. For every 100 females, there were 139.1 males. For every 100 females age 18 and over, there were 144.7 males.

The median household income was $22,500 and the median family income was $28,750. Males had a median income of $26,875 compared with $18,333 for females. The per capita income for the city was $11,654. There were 13.3% of families and 17.8% of the population living below the poverty line, including no under eighteens and 17.6% of those over 64.
