= Arctander Township, Kandiyohi County, Minnesota =

Arctander Township, Minnesota
- Township
- Location within Minnesota and the United States Arctander Township (the United States)
- Coordinates: 45°17′0″N 95°11′54″W
- Country: United States
- State: Minnesota
- County: Kandiyohi

Area
  - Total: 36.1 sq mi (93.4 km^{2})
  - Land: 34.4 sq mi (89.2 km^{2})
  - Water: 1.6 sq mi (4.2 km^{2})
- Elevation: 1,240 ft (378 m)

Population (2000)
  - Total: 401
  - Density: 12/sq mi (4.5/km^{2})
- Time zone: UTC-6 (Central (CST))
  - Summer (DST): UTC-5 (CDT)
- FIPS code: 27-01990
- GNIS feature ID: 0663450

Arctander Township is a township in Kandiyohi County, Minnesota, United States. The population was 401 at the 2000 census.

== History ==
Arctander Township was organized in 1879, and named for John W. Arctander, a Norwegian settler.

== Geography ==
According to the United States Census Bureau, the township has a total area of 36.1 square miles (93 km^{2}), of which 34.5 square miles (89 km^{2}) is land and 1.6 square miles (4.1 km^{2}) (4.52%) is water.

== Demographics ==
As of the census of 2000, there were 401 people, 145 households, and 117 families residing in the township. The population density was 11.6 inhabitants per square mile (4.5/km^{2}). There were 187 housing units at an average density of 5.4 per square mile (2.1/km^{2}). The racial makeup of the township was 98.00% White, 0.25% African American, 0.50% Asian, and 1.25% from two or more races. Hispanic or Latino of any race were 0.25% of the population.

There were 145 households, out of which 36.6% had children under the age of 18 living with them, 76.6% were married couples living together, 0.7% had a female householder with no husband present, and 19.3% were non-families. 16.6% of all households were made up of individuals, and 8.3% had someone living alone who was 65 years of age or older. The average household size was 2.77 and the average family size was 3.13.

In the township the population was spread out, with 26.4% under the age of 18, 7.5% from 18 to 24, 25.4% from 25 to 44, 23.9% from 45 to 64, and 16.7% who were 65 years of age or older. The median age was 39 years. For every 100 females, there were 109.9 males. For every 100 females age 18 and over, there were 116.9 males.

The median income for a household in the township was $42,656, and the median income for a family was $46,875. Males had a median income of $32,639 versus $20,972 for females. The per capita income for the township was $17,848. About 8.3% of families and 5.1% of the population were below the poverty line, including none of those under age 18 and 23.6% of those age 65 or over.
