= St. Johns Township, Kandiyohi County, Minnesota =

St. Johns Township, Minnesota
- Township
- Location within Minnesota and the United States St. Johns Township (the United States)
- Coordinates: 45°6′52″N 95°10′52″W
- Country: United States
- State: Minnesota
- County: Kandiyohi

Area
  - Total: 35.0 sq mi (90.7 km^{2})
  - Land: 34.7 sq mi (89.8 km^{2})
  - Water: 0.31 sq mi (0.8 km^{2})
- Elevation: 1,109 ft (338 m)

Population (2000)
  - Total: 386
  - Density: 11/sq mi (4.3/km^{2})
- Time zone: UTC-6 (Central (CST))
  - Summer (DST): UTC-5 (CDT)
- FIPS code: 27-57076
- GNIS feature ID: 0665515
- Website: https://stjohnstownship.com/

St. Johns Township is a township in Kandiyohi County, Minnesota, United States. The population was 386 at the 2000 census.

St. Johns Township was organized in 1872.

== Geography ==
According to the United States Census Bureau, the township has a total area of 35.0 square miles (90.6 km^{2}), of which 34.7 square miles (89.8 km^{2}) is land and 0.3 square mile (0.8 km^{2}) (0.91%) is water.

== Demographics ==
As of the census of 2000, there were 386 people, 143 households, and 110 families residing in the township. The population density was 11.1 people per square mile (4.3/km^{2}). There were 152 housing units at an average density of 4.4/sq mi (1.7/km^{2}). The racial makeup of the township was 98.45% White, 0.26% Native American, 0.52% from other races, and 0.78% from two or more races. Hispanic or Latino of any race were 1.04% of the population.

There were 143 households, out of which 35.0% had children under the age of 18 living with them, 69.2% were married couples living together, 2.8% had a female householder with no husband present, and 22.4% were non-families. 19.6% of all households were made up of individuals, and 7.7% had someone living alone who was 65 years of age or older. The average household size was 2.70 and the average family size was 3.07.

In the township the population was spread out, with 28.0% under the age of 18, 6.2% from 18 to 24, 30.1% from 25 to 44, 24.6% from 45 to 64, and 11.1% who were 65 years of age or older. The median age was 37 years. For every 100 females, there were 97.9 males. For every 100 females age 18 and over, there were 105.9 males.

The median income for a household in the township was $48,125, and the median income for a family was $55,781. Males had a median income of $30,893 versus $21,094 for females. The per capita income for the township was $21,653. About 0.9% of families and 4.4% of the population were below the poverty line, including 5.6% of those under age 18 and 10.8% of those age 65 or over.
