= Norway Lake (Cass County, Minnesota) =

Lake in the state of Minnesota, United States

- Location within Minnesota
- Location: Cass County, Minnesota
- Coordinates: 46°44′21″N 94°23′49″W
- Type: lake

Norway Lake is a lake in Cass County, Minnesota, in the United States.

Norway Lake was named for Norway pines lining its banks.

== See also ==
- List of lakes in Minnesota
