= Norway Lake Township =

Norway Lake may refer to:

- Norway Lake Township, Kandiyohi County, Minnesota
- Norway Lake Township, North Dakota, in Wells County, North Dakota
