= Monson Lake State Park =

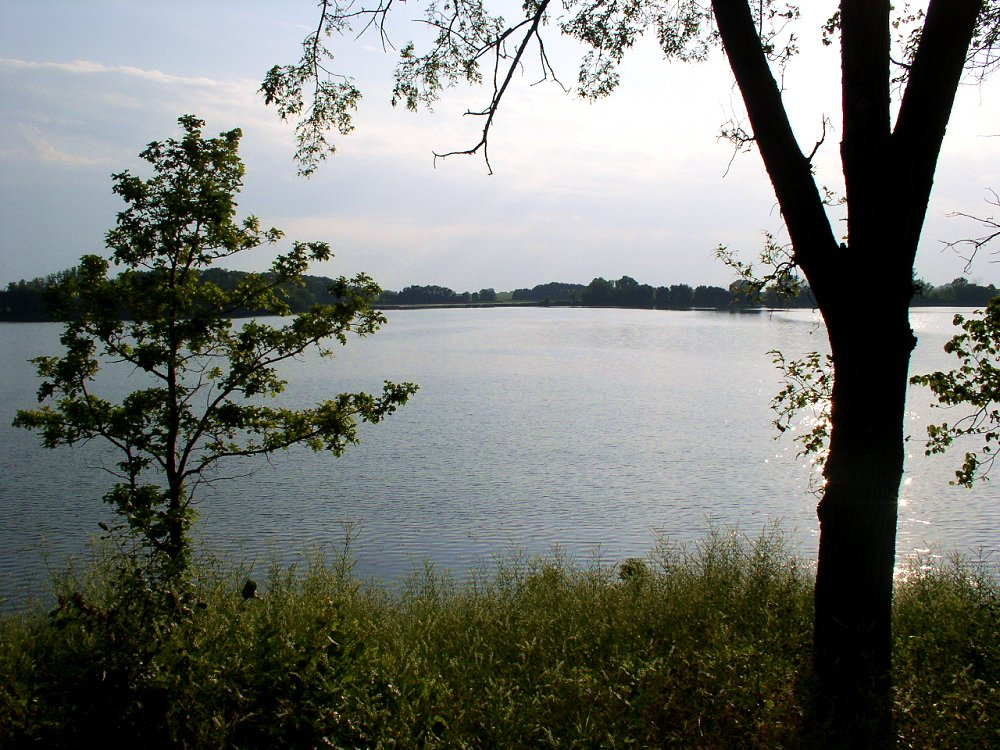
- Monson Lake

- Location within Minnesota Location within the United States
- Location: Swift, Minnesota, United States
- Coordinates: 45°19′14″N 95°16′13″W
- Area: 346 acres (140 ha)
- Elevation: 1,253 ft (382 m)
- Established: 1937
- Governing body: Minnesota Department of Natural Resources

- Monson Lake State Park CCC/WPA/Rustic Style Historic Resources
- U.S. National Register of Historic Places
- U.S. Historic district
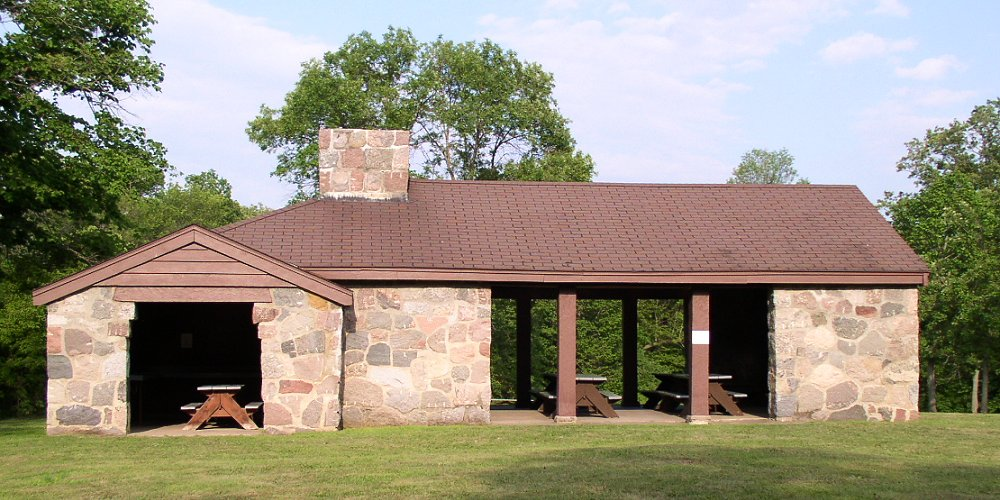
- Monson Lake State Park's Combination Building

- Location within Minnesota Location within the United States
- Location: Swift County, Minnesota, off Co. Rd. 95 SE of Sunburg
- Nearest city: Sunburg, Minnesota
- Area: 31 acres (13 ha)
- Built: 1936–1938
- Architectural style: National Park Service rustic
- MPS: Minnesota State Park CCC/WPA/Rustic Style MPS
- NRHP reference No.: 89001666
- Added to NRHP: October 25, 1989

Monson Lake State Park is a state park of Minnesota, United States, originally established as a memorial to 13 Swedish American pioneers who were killed there in the Dakota War of 1862. A district of 1930s New Deal structures is on the National Register of Historic Places. Despite being nearly doubled in size in 2009, the state park remains one of Minnesota's smallest. It is located off Minnesota State Highway 9 just west of Sunburg and 20 miles (32 km) northwest of Willmar. This seasonally-staffed park is managed from nearby Sibley State Park.

== Geography ==
Much of Monson Lake State Park's acreage is water, with land mostly comprising isthmuses between, and islands in, the three adjacent lakes of Monson, West Sunburg, and East Sunburg. Monson Lake, whose shore forms the western boundary of the park, is 152 acres (62 ha) and up to 21 feet (6.4 m) deep. West Sunburg Lake is about 178 acres (72 ha). Monson Lake has three inlets, and one outlet to West Sunburg. The lakes are part of the watershed of the Chippewa River, a tributary of the Minnesota River.

== Natural history ==
=== Geology ===
Monson Lake State Park lies on a band of lakes and rolling hills called the Alexandria Moraine. This moraine was formed by rocks and sediments dropped by the Wadena Lobe of the Laurentide Ice Sheet 30,000 years ago during the last glacial period. The whole region is thickly blanketed with till 100 to 400 feet (30 to 122 m) thick. Blocks of ice that broke off from the glacier melted in place, forming the park's trio of kettle lakes.

=== Flora ===
Prior to European settlement the area would have borne tallgrass prairie, with groves of trees growing where the lakes blocked some of the advancing wildfires. Today the park is primarily forested with basswood, bur oak, and green ash with a few stands of northern red oak. Ironwood is abundant in the shrub layer and the understory is characterized by Virginia waterleaf. Other wildflowers include nodding trillium, large-flowered bellwort, Dutchman's breeches, bloodroot, jack-in-the-pulpit, and starry false Solomon seal. There are 42 acres (17 ha) of this habitat type, all of it secondary forest.

The lakeshores and other marshes are characterized by emergent plants like prairie bulrush, bur-reed, arrowhead, and spikerush.

Two widespread invasive species are established in the park, common buckthorn and reed canary grass.

=== Fauna ===
Mammals most commonly found in the park are white-tailed deer, groundhogs, minks, foxes, squirrels, and eastern chipmunks. Monson Lake State Park is located on a major corridor of the Mississippi Flyway and attracts a variety of birds. Regionally threatened or uncommon species include Henslow's sparrows, American white pelicans, Forster's terns, Franklin's gulls, horned grebes, and trumpeter swans.

=== Water quality ===
At the time of the most recent survey in 2005, Monson Lake was found to have good water clarity and low to moderate nutrient pollution. What pollution there was came largely from agricultural runoff. Aquatic and emergent plants exhibited good density and biodiversity. Monson Lake does experience cyanobacteria blooms in summer, but is free of Eurasian water milfoil and other invasive aquatic plants. The water quality in West Sunburg Lake is considered very high.

=== Climate ===
The park experiences a humid continental climate of significant temperature variation between summer and winter. The mean temperature in July is 71.8 °F (22.1 °C) and in January 9.7 °F (−12.4 °C). Average annual precipitation has been 31.67 inches (80.4 cm). Average snowfall per year is 53.6 inches (136 cm) and the growing season usually runs 156 days.

== Cultural history ==
Three archaeological sites demonstrate that the future park was occupied by Native Americans at least as long ago as the Woodland period (1000 BCE – 1000 CE). Excavation revealed stone tools including obsidian from the Great Plains, flint from the Knife River in North Dakota, and quartzite from near Hixton, Wisconsin, suggesting a wide trade network.

=== Euro-American settlement ===
When Anders and Daniel Broberg, immigrant brothers from Sweden, purchased 160 acres (65 ha) on July 15, 1861, it was at the very edge of the frontier. Anders and his wife Christiana had four children: Anna Stina, Johannes, Andreas, and Christiana. Daniel and his wife Anna Stina had two sons—Peter and Alfred—and a third, John, would be born that fall. Together with the neighboring families of Swen Oman and Johannes Lundborg they formed what was called the West Lake Settlement. However the growing Euro-American population was making it increasingly difficult for the native Dakota people to pursue their traditional lifestyle. Resettlement on reservations, treaty violations by the United States, and late or unfair annuity payments by Indian agents caused increasing hunger and hardship among the Dakota.

=== The attack at the Broberg cabin ===
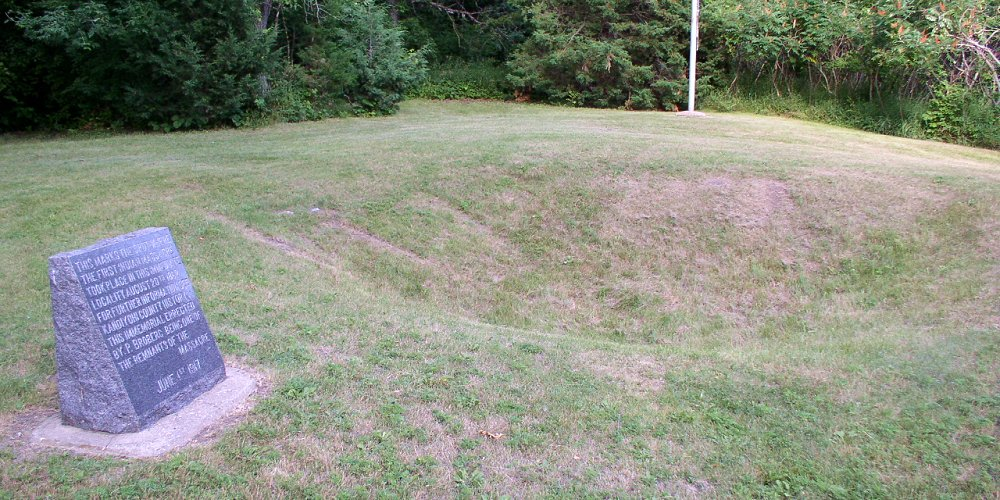
The site of the Broberg cabin and a 1917 memorial placed by survivor Peter Broberg

On the morning of Wednesday, August 20, 1862, most residents in the West Lake Settlement were unaware that violence had broken out between Dakota and white settlers three days earlier. A pastor who circulated among the scattered pioneers was holding a church service at the Lundborg cabin. The Brobergs and the Omans attended, leaving many of the younger children at home. Those at the Broberg cabin were visited by about 30 Dakotas, dressed in war regalia and not as friendly as usual. The frightened settlers sent seven-year-old Peter Broberg to fetch the adults. Anders Broberg and the four sons of Andreas Lundborg hurried the 2 miles (3.2 km) to the scene.

At first the Dakota seemed friendly, but the situation abruptly soured. It is not known whether any of the five white men were armed. Anders and the Lundborg boys were shot, though Samuel Lundborg would survive his wounds. Andreas Lundborg arrived just as his sons were being attacked. Armed but obviously outnumbered, he ran and several Dakota gave chase. At that point, however, the wagon appeared in which Daniel Broberg was driving the women and children home, and the attackers focused on them instead. Daniel was shot and 7-year-old Christiana was clubbed down with a rifle. 16-year-old Anna Stina managed to flee into a cornfield, where she caught up with Andreas Lundborg. Her cousin Peter ran almost 400 yards (370 m) to the Oman cabin, which was in sight. A Dakota tore Peter's baby brother from their mother's hands and threw him to the ground. The warriors tried to take the two Mrs. Brobergs prisoner, but they resisted and were shot.

The Dakota killed the three children and an adult left in the Broberg cabin, and went on to loot the Lundborg cabin. The elder Lundborg had evacuated his remaining family and hidden with Anna Stina Broberg in a slough. They were shot at but no one was hit. Surrounded by open ground, Peter Broberg and the Oman family were trapped in their cabin. Late that afternoon three Dakota approached the Oman home. The six settlers inside managed to duck into the cellar through a trapdoor, and listened as the place was shot up and looted.

Finally the Dakota departed, though the Omans hid in the cellar until after sunset. They emerged and spent the night in the woods, encountering the superficially wounded Samuel Lundborg at dawn. The various survivors gathered on an island in a nearby lake. Two days after the attack, several settlers went to gather and bury the dead. The 13 killed—Anders (age 43), Christiana (36), Johannes (13), Andreas (10), and Christiana Broberg (7); Daniel (38), Anna Stina (30), Alfred (4), and John Broberg (10 months); Andreas (25), Gustaf (23), and Lars Lundborg (22), and Johannes Broberg (age and relation uncertain)—were all buried in a nearby field. Peter and the younger Anna Stina were the only members of their respective families to survive.

As the war broadened, many settlers fled the region. Anna Stina and Peter returned to the area 3 years later, though settlement didn't fully rebound until the 1890s.

=== The Monson Lake Memorial Association ===
The notion of preserving the Broberg cabin site as a park came to a local resident named Ole Ellingboe on August 20, 1926, the 64th anniversary of the attack. The idea occurred to him while walking past the site on his way to church, where it was received favorably by the rest of the congregation. The next year the Monson Lake Memorial Association formed and raised $225 to buy 2 acres (0.81 ha) from owner Albert Monson.

The dedication of the private memorial park on August 21, 1927, drew 10,000 attendees. The Monson Lake Memorial Association continued to hold wildly popular annual events through the Great Depression, marked by speeches, plays, music, and refreshments. State and national politicians and other dignitaries attended. Following a hiatus during World War II, observances were sporadic but elaborate. The largest-ever attendance was 15,000 in 1958, Minnesota's centennial year. The 1962 event included a two-hour, four-act play.

From the beginning the observations presented only a European American perspective, treating the 13 white victims as veritable martyrs. It wasn't until 1987 that the injustices suffered by the Dakota were included in the programming. That event only drew a few hundred. The 1990 observation featured readings by poet and essayist Bill Holm.

=== New Deal development ===
Originally the 2-acre (0.81 ha) park was privately owned by the Monson Lake Memorial Association. During the Great Depression, the Franklin D. Roosevelt administration funded public works projects to ease unemployment, and park development was a significant focus. To this end, in 1935 the Association convinced the Minnesota Emergency Relief Agency to purchase and expand the park. The Veterans Conservation Corps—a branch of the Civilian Conservation Corps for unemployed World War I veterans—had a major camp at nearby Sibley State Park, so a side camp was established at Monson Lake in 1936. The VCC men constructed a Sanitation Building and a Combination Building (a picnic shelter with a public cooking area and space for a concession service). These were built in the National Park Service rustic style with local granite and white oak. Crews from the Works Progress Administration created the gravel entrance road and parking lot. Monson Lake Memorial State Park, as it was originally named, was dedicated in 1938. Since it was designated a memorial state park, only limited recreational facilities were built.

In 1989 31 acres (13 ha) encompassing these structures were added to the National Register of Historic Places. Since low visitation has never spurred significant alterations, it is the only Minnesota state park that remains nearly unchanged from its original development.

=== Later history ===
In 1956 the original name Monson Lake Memorial State Park was shortened by officially dropping the word 'memorial.' Additional developments over the years included staff facilities, showers in the Sanitation Building, a boat ramp, and interpretive signage. During the 1962 centennial of the conflict, the Swift County Historical Society donated a memorial plaque. Aside from the irregular annual observances, usage of the state park remained limited. Legislation was even passed in 1965 to hand off the property as a local park, though this was never implemented.

Monson Lake State Park remained 187 acres (76 ha) for decades, with its eastern border including only a sliver of West Sunberg Lake. In the mid-2000s decade, the owners of an undeveloped hunting retreat to the east approached the park about selling to the state rather than a real estate developer. Their 158 acres (64 ha) included most of the rest of West Sunburg Lake and some of East Sunburg Lake. This is unusual because lakes in Minnesota remain public property, but in the 1930s the Sunburg Lakes had been dry and the ownership rights were bought and sold. Approvals and fund appropriation took the state three years, and the $395,000 purchase was finalized in June 2009. The new parcel comprises 44 acres (18 ha) of land and 114 acres (46 ha) of water, with 10,200 feet (3,100 m) of shoreline. The new parcel will be managed as a refuge for waterfowl.

== Recreation ==
Activities at Monson Lake State Park include birdwatching, camping, canoeing, fishing, hiking, and picnicking. The campground has just 20 sites and is only open in summer. There is a boat ramp on Monson Lake. Game fish in Monson Lake are walleye, northern pike, largemouth bass, black crappie, yellow perch, and bluegill. The walleye are stocked biennially. 1.2 miles (1.9 km) of trail currently trace through the park. A canoe route starts at the boat ramp, leads across Monson Lake, and traverses a 463-foot (141 m) portage into West Sunburg Lake. In winter snowshoeing is allowed anywhere in the park.
