= Roseland Township, Kandiyohi County, Minnesota =

Roseland Township, Minnesota
- Township
- Location within Minnesota and the United States Roseland Township (the United States)
- Coordinates: 44°56′20″N 95°4′29″W
- Country: United States
- State: Minnesota
- County: Kandiyohi

Area
  - Total: 35.1 sq mi (91.0 km^{2})
  - Land: 35.1 sq mi (91.0 km^{2})
  - Water: 0 sq mi (0.0 km^{2})
- Elevation: 1,122 ft (342 m)

Population (2000)
  - Total: 477
  - Density: 13/sq mi (5.2/km^{2})
- Time zone: UTC-6 (Central (CST))
  - Summer (DST): UTC-5 (CDT)
- FIPS code: 27-55708
- GNIS feature ID: 0665465

Roseland Township is a township in Kandiyohi County, Minnesota, United States. The population was 477 at the 2000 census.

== History ==
Roseland Township was organized in 1889. According to Warren Upham, the name is said to be derived from Swedish meaning "flower garden".

== Geography ==
According to the United States Census Bureau, the township has a total area of 35.1 square miles (91.0 km^{2}), of which 35.1 square miles (91.0 km^{2}) is land and 0.03% is water.

== Demographics ==
As of the census of 2000, there were 477 people, 157 households, and 138 families residing in the township. The population density was 13.6 people per square mile (5.2/km^{2}). There were 168 housing units at an average density of 4.8/sq mi (1.8/km^{2}). The racial makeup of the township was 97.48% White, 1.47% Asian, 0.21% from other races, and 0.84% from two or more races. Hispanic or Latino of any race were 3.35% of the population.

There were 157 households, out of which 42.7% had children under the age of 18 living with them, 79.0% were married couples living together, 3.8% had a female householder with no husband present, and 12.1% were non-families. 10.2% of all households were made up of individuals, and 6.4% had someone living alone who was 65 years of age or older. The average household size was 3.04 and the average family size was 3.25.

In the township the population was spread out, with 31.2% under the age of 18, 7.1% from 18 to 24, 28.7% from 25 to 44, 21.0% from 45 to 64, and 11.9% who were 65 years of age or older. The median age was 35 years. For every 100 females, there were 115.8 males. For every 100 females age 18 and over, there were 103.7 males.

The median income for a household in the township was $40,625, and the median income for a family was $44,750. Males had a median income of $31,429 versus $21,500 for females. The per capita income for the township was $15,225. About 5.2% of families and 9.1% of the population were below the poverty line, including 12.9% of those under age 18 and 3.9% of those age 65 or over.
