= Mamre Township, Kandiyohi County, Minnesota =

Mamre Township, Minnesota
- Township
- Location within Minnesota and the United States Mamre Township (the United States)
- Coordinates: 45°11′48″N 95°10′31″W
- Country: United States
- State: Minnesota
- County: Kandiyohi

Area
  - Total: 35.6 sq mi (92.2 km^{2})
  - Land: 33.9 sq mi (87.8 km^{2})
  - Water: 1.7 sq mi (4.4 km^{2})
- Elevation: 1,122 ft (342 m)

Population (2000)
  - Total: 384
  - Density: 11/sq mi (4.4/km^{2})
- Time zone: UTC-6 (Central (CST))
  - Summer (DST): UTC-5 (CDT)
- FIPS code: 27-39662
- GNIS feature ID: 0664883
- Website: https://mamretownship.com/

Mamre Township is a township in Kandiyohi County, Minnesota, United States. The population was 384 at the 2000 census.

Mamre Township was organized in 1870, and named after Mamre, a biblical place.

== Geography ==
According to the United States Census Bureau, the township has a total area of 35.6 mi^{2} (92 km^{2}), of which 33.9 mi^{2} (88 km^{2}) is land and 1.7 mi^{2} (4.4 km^{2}) (4.78%) is water.

== Demographics ==
As of the census of 2000, there were 384 people, 128 households, and 104 families residing in the township. The population density was 4.4 people/km^{2} (11 people/mi^{2}). There were 133 housing units at an average density of 1.5 units/km^{2} (3.9 units/mi^{2}). The racial makeup of the township was 98.70% White, 0.52% Native American and 0.78% Asian. Hispanic or Latino of any race were 1.82% of the population.

There were 128 households, out of which 38.3% had children under the age of 18 living with them, 70.3% were married couples living together, 7.8% had a female householder with no husband present, and 18.0% were non-families. 13.3% of all households were made up of individuals, and 6.3% had someone living alone who was 65 years of age or older. The average household size was 3.00 and the average family size was 3.34.

In the township the population was spread out, with 31.3% under the age of 18, 7.6% from 18 to 24, 28.4% from 25 to 44, 24.5% from 45 to 64, and 8.3% who were 65 years of age or older. The median age was 35 years. For every 100 females, there were 115.7 males. For every 100 females age 18 and over, there were 118.2 males.

The median income for a household in the township was $46,250, and the median income for a family was $48,125. Males had a median income of $31,750 versus $20,833 for females. The per capita income for the township was $16,668. About 10.6% of families and 12.0% of the population were below the poverty line, including 20.0% of those under age 18 and 11.1% of those age 65 or over.
