= Norway Lake Township, Kandiyohi County, Minnesota =

Norway Lake Township, Minnesota
- Township
- Location within Minnesota and the United States Norway Lake Township (the United States)
- Coordinates: 45°22′6″N 95°11′21″W
- Country: United States
- State: Minnesota
- County: Kandiyohi

Area
  - Total: 35.4 sq mi (91.7 km^{2})
  - Land: 32.6 sq mi (84.5 km^{2})
  - Water: 2.8 sq mi (7.2 km^{2})
- Elevation: 1,250 ft (380 m)

Population (2000)
  - Total: 284
  - Density: 8.8/sq mi (3.4/km^{2})
- Time zone: UTC-6 (Central (CST))
  - Summer (DST): UTC-5 (CDT)
- FIPS code: 27-47464
- GNIS feature ID: 0665180

Norway Lake Township is a township in Kandiyohi County, Minnesota, United States. The population was 284 at the 2000 census.

== History ==
Norway Lake Township was organized in 1866, and named for its Norway Lake.

== Geography ==
According to the United States Census Bureau, the township has a total area of 35.4 square miles (91.7 km^{2}), of which 32.6 square miles (84.5 km^{2}) is land and 2.8 square miles (7.2 km^{2}) (7.82%) is water.

== Demographics ==
At the 2000 census, there were 284 people, 115 households and 83 families residing in the township. The population density was 8.7 people per square mile (3.4/km^{2}). There were 137 housing units at an average density of 4.2/sq mi (1.6/km^{2}). The racial makeup of the township was 99.65% White and 0.35% Native American.

There were 115 households, of which 27.0% had children under the age of 18 living with them, 63.5% were married couples living together, 4.3% had a female householder with no husband present, and 27.8% were non-families. 23.5% of all households were made up of individuals, and 8.7% had someone living alone who was 65 years of age or older. The average household size was 2.47 and the average family size was 2.87.

Age distribution was 21.8% under the age of 18, 6.7% from 18 to 24, 25.7% from 25 to 44, 30.3% from 45 to 64, and 15.5% who were 65 years of age or older. The median age was 44 years. For every 100 females, there were 127.2 males. For every 100 females age 18 and over, there were 119.8 males.

The median household income was $36,042, and the median family income was $41,111. Males had a median income of $26,563 versus $17,031 for females. The per capita income for the township was $16,803. About 2.5% of families and 4.0% of the population were below the poverty line, including 1.8% of those under the age of eighteen and none of those 65 or over.
