= Norway Lake (Kandiyohi County, Minnesota) =

Lake in the state of Minnesota, United States

- Location within Minnesota
- Location: Kandiyohi County, Minnesota
- Coordinates: 45°19′13″N 95°7′17″W
- Type: lake

Norway Lake is a lake in Kandiyohi County, in the U.S. state of Minnesota. A majority of the early settlers near the lake were Norwegians, thus the name was.

== See also ==
- List of lakes in Minnesota
