= Chippewa Falls Township, Pope County, Minnesota =

Chippewa Falls Township, Minnesota
- Township
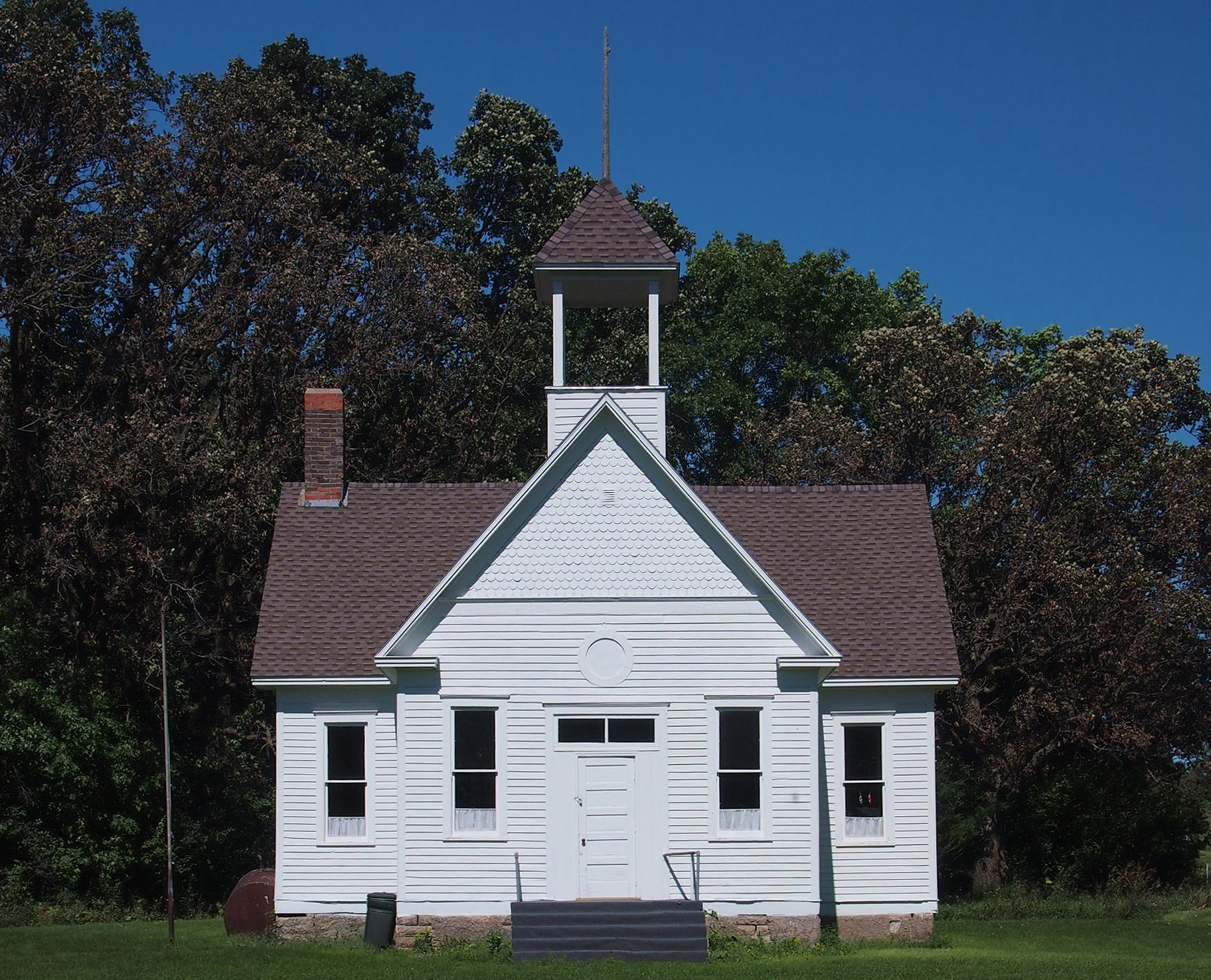
- Chippewa Falls' historic township hall, built in 1906 as a school

- Location within the state of Minnesota Chippewa Falls Township, Minnesota (the United States)
- Coordinates: 45°31′43″N 95°18′15″W
- Country: United States
- State: Minnesota
- County: Pope

Area
  - Total: 35.4 sq mi (91.6 km^{2})
  - Land: 34.2 sq mi (88.7 km^{2})
  - Water: 1.1 sq mi (2.9 km^{2})
- Elevation: 1,296 ft (395 m)

Population (2000)
  - Total: 231
  - Density: 6.7/sq mi (2.6/km^{2})
- Time zone: UTC-6 (Central (CST))
  - Summer (DST): UTC-5 (CDT)
- FIPS code: 27-11332
- GNIS feature ID: 0663796

Chippewa Falls Township is a township in Pope County, Minnesota, United States. The population was 218 at the 2020 census. It includes the unincorporated community of Terrace, Minnesota.

== History ==
Chippewa Falls Township was named for the falls on the Chippewa River. The township was surveyed in 1856 and organized in 1862.

== Geography ==
According to the United States Census Bureau, the township has a total area of 35.3 square miles (91 km^{2}), of which 34.2 square miles (89 km^{2}) is land and 1.1 square miles (2.8 km^{2}) (3.17%) is water.

== Demographics ==
As of the census of 2000, there were 231 people, 97 households and 67 families residing in the township. The population density was 6.7 inhabitants per square mile (2.6/km^{2}). There were 127 housing units at an average density of 3.7 per square mile (1.4/km^{2}). The racial makeup of the township was 99.57% White and 0.43% African American.

There were 97 households, out of which 26.8% had children under the age of 18 living with them, 62.9% were married couples living together, 2.1% had a female householder with no husband present, and 29.9% were non-families. 24.7% of all households were made up of individuals, and 9.3% had someone living alone who was 65 years of age or older. The average household size was 2.38 and the average family size was 2.88.

In the township, the population was spread out, with 21.2% under the age of 18, 5.6% from 18 to 24, 26.4% from 25 to 44, 32.0% from 45 to 64, and 14.7% who were 65 years of age or older. The median age was 42 years. For every 100 females, there were 99.1 males. For every 100 females age 18 and over, there were 116.7 males.

The median income for a household in the township was $36,071, and the median income for a family was $37,679. Males had a median income of $26,875 versus $18,333 for females. The per capita income for the township was $19,653. About 2.6% of families and 3.5% of the population were below the poverty line, including 9.3% of those under the age of eighteen and none of those 65 or over.
