= Edwards Township, Kandiyohi County, Minnesota =

Edwards Township, Minnesota
- Township
- Location within Minnesota and the United States Edwards Township (the United States)
- Coordinates: 45°1′28″N 95°12′15″W
- Country: United States
- State: Minnesota
- County: Kandiyohi

Area
  - Total: 35.8 sq mi (92.6 km^{2})
  - Land: 35.4 sq mi (91.6 km^{2})
  - Water: 0.39 sq mi (1.0 km^{2})
- Elevation: 1,093 ft (333 m)

Population (2000)
  - Total: 304
  - Density: 8.5/sq mi (3.3/km^{2})
- Time zone: UTC-6 (Central (CST))
  - Summer (DST): UTC-5 (CDT)
- FIPS code: 27-18242
- GNIS feature ID: 0664051

Edwards Township is a township in Kandiyohi County, Minnesota, United States. The population was 304 at the 2000 census.

Edwards Township was organized in 1871, and named for S. S. Edwards, an early settler.

== Geography ==
According to the United States Census Bureau, the township has a total area of 35.7 square miles (92 km^{2}), of which 35.4 square miles (92 km^{2}) is land and 0.4 square miles (1.0 km^{2}) (1.04%) is water.

== Demographics ==
As of the census of 2000, there were 304 people, 101 households, and 84 families residing in the township. The population density was 8.6/mi^{2} (3.3/km^{2}). There were 106 housing units at an average density of 3.0/mi^{2} (1.2/km^{2}). The racial makeup of the township was 97.37% White, 1.64% African American, 0.33% Native American, 0.33% Pacific Islander, 0.33% from other races. Hispanic or Latino of any race were 2.30% of the population.

There were 101 households, out of which 36.6% had children under the age of 18 living with them, 78.2% were married couples living together, 2.0% had a female householder with no husband present, and 16.8% were non-families. 12.9% of all households were made up of individuals, and 6.9% had someone living alone who was 65 years of age or older. The average household size was 2.98 and the average family size was 3.32.

In the township the population was spread out, with 29.3% under the age of 18, 9.2% from 18 to 24, 25.3% from 25 to 44, 24.0% from 45 to 64, and 12.2% who were 65 years of age or older. The median age was 37 years. For every 100 females, there were 109.7 males. For every 100 females age 18 and over, there were 117.2 males.

The median income for a household in the township was $44,063, and the median income for a family was $48,125. Males had a median income of $26,719 versus $21,375 for females. The per capita income for the township was $16,256. About 5.5% of families and 5.7% of the population were below the poverty line, including 7.1% of those under the age of eighteen and 16.7% of those 65 or over.
