= Sedan, Minnesota =

City in Minnesota, United States

- City
- Location of Sedan, Minnesota
- Coordinates: 45°34′41″N 95°14′43″W
- Country: United States
- State: Minnesota
- County: Pope
- Incorporated: November 19, 1897

Government
  - Mayor: Keith Kirchhevel

Area
  - Total: 0.507 sq mi (1.312 km^{2})
  - Land: 0.507 sq mi (1.312 km^{2})
  - Water: 0 sq mi (0.000 km^{2})
- Elevation: 1,352 ft (412 m)

Population (2020)
  - Total: 43
  - Estimate (2022): 45
  - Density: 84.9/sq mi (32.77/km^{2})
- Time zone: UTC−6 (Central (CST))
  - Summer (DST): UTC−5 (CDT)
- ZIP Code: 56334
- Area code: 320
- FIPS code: 27-59188
- GNIS feature ID: 2396568
- Sales tax: 6.875%

Sedan is a city in Pope County, Minnesota, United States. The population was 43 at the 2020 census.

== History ==
A post office called Sedan was established in 1892, and remained in operation until 1996. The construction of a church began in 1904 and was dedicated on April 16, 1905. The city was named after Sedan, in France.

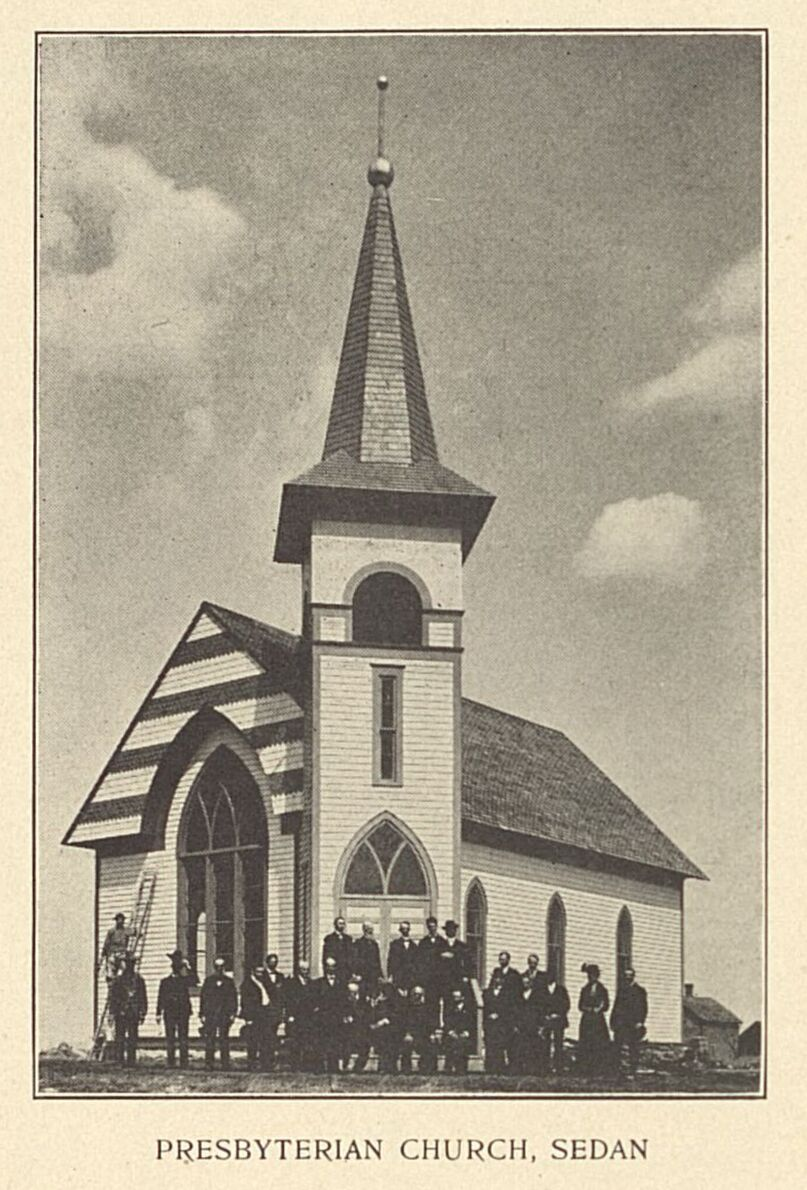
Presbyterian Church, Sedan

== Geography ==
According to the United States Census Bureau, the city has a total area of 0.507 square miles (1.31 km^{2}), all land.

Minnesota State Highway 55 serves as a main route in the community.

== Demographics ==
Historical population
Census	Pop.	Note	%±
1900	153		—
1910	127		−17.0%
1920	147		15.7%
1930	125		−15.0%
1940	126		0.8%
1950	134		6.3%
1960	91		−32.1%
1970	55		−39.6%
1980	62		12.7%
1990	63		1.6%
2000	65		3.2%
2010	45		−30.8%
2020	43		−4.4%
2022 (est.)	45		4.7%
U.S. Decennial Census; 2020 Census

=== 2010 census ===
As of the 2010 census, there were 45 people, 21 households, and 10 families living in the city. The population density was 88.2 inhabitants per square mile (34.1/km^{2}). There were 28 housing units at an average density of 54.9 per square mile (21.2/km^{2}). The racial makeup of the city was 100.0% White.

There were 21 households, of which 14.3% had children under the age of 18 living with them, 23.8% were married couples living together, 14.3% had a female householder with no husband present, 9.5% had a male householder with no wife present, and 52.4% were non-families. 33.3% of all households were made up of individuals, and 4.8% had someone living alone who was 65 years of age or older. The average household size was 2.14 and the average family size was 2.80.

The median age in the city was 40.8 years. 11.1% of residents were under the age of 18; 17.8% were between the ages of 18 and 24; 33.3% were from 25 to 44; 31.1% were from 45 to 64; and 6.7% were 65 years of age or older. The gender makeup of the city was 48.9% male and 51.1% female.

=== 2000 census ===
As of the 2000 census, there were 65 people, 30 households, and 15 families living in the city. The population density was 128.2 inhabitants per square mile (49.5/km^{2}). There were 31 housing units at an average density of 61.2 per square mile (23.6/km^{2}). The racial makeup of the city was 100.00% White.

There were 30 households, out of which 26.7% had children under the age of 18 living with them, 46.7% were married couples living together, 3.3% had a female householder with no husband present, and 46.7% were non-families. 36.7% of all households were made up of individuals, and 13.3% had someone living alone who was 65 years of age or older. The average household size was 2.17 and the average family size was 2.94.

In the city, the population was spread out, with 21.5% under the age of 18, 9.2% from 18 to 24, 35.4% from 25 to 44, 21.5% from 45 to 64, and 12.3% who were 65 years of age or older. The median age was 39 years. For every 100 females, there were 103.1 males. For every 100 females age 18 and over, there were 112.5 males.

The median income for a household in the city was $29,375, and the median income for a family was $40,833. Males had a median income of $31,458 versus $16,750 for females. The per capita income for the city was $16,355. There were 11.1% of families and 15.5% of the population living below the poverty line, including 33.3% of under eighteens and none of those over 64.
