= Lake Grove =

Lake Grove or Grove Lake may refer to:

- Grove Lake (Clay and Otter Tail counties, Minnesota)
- Grove Lake (Pope County, Minnesota)
- Grove Lake Township, Pope County, Minnesota
- Grove Lake, Minnesota
- Lake Grove Township, Mahnomen County, Minnesota
- Lake Grove, New York
- Lake Grove, Oregon
