= Lyla Mae Olson =

American nurse

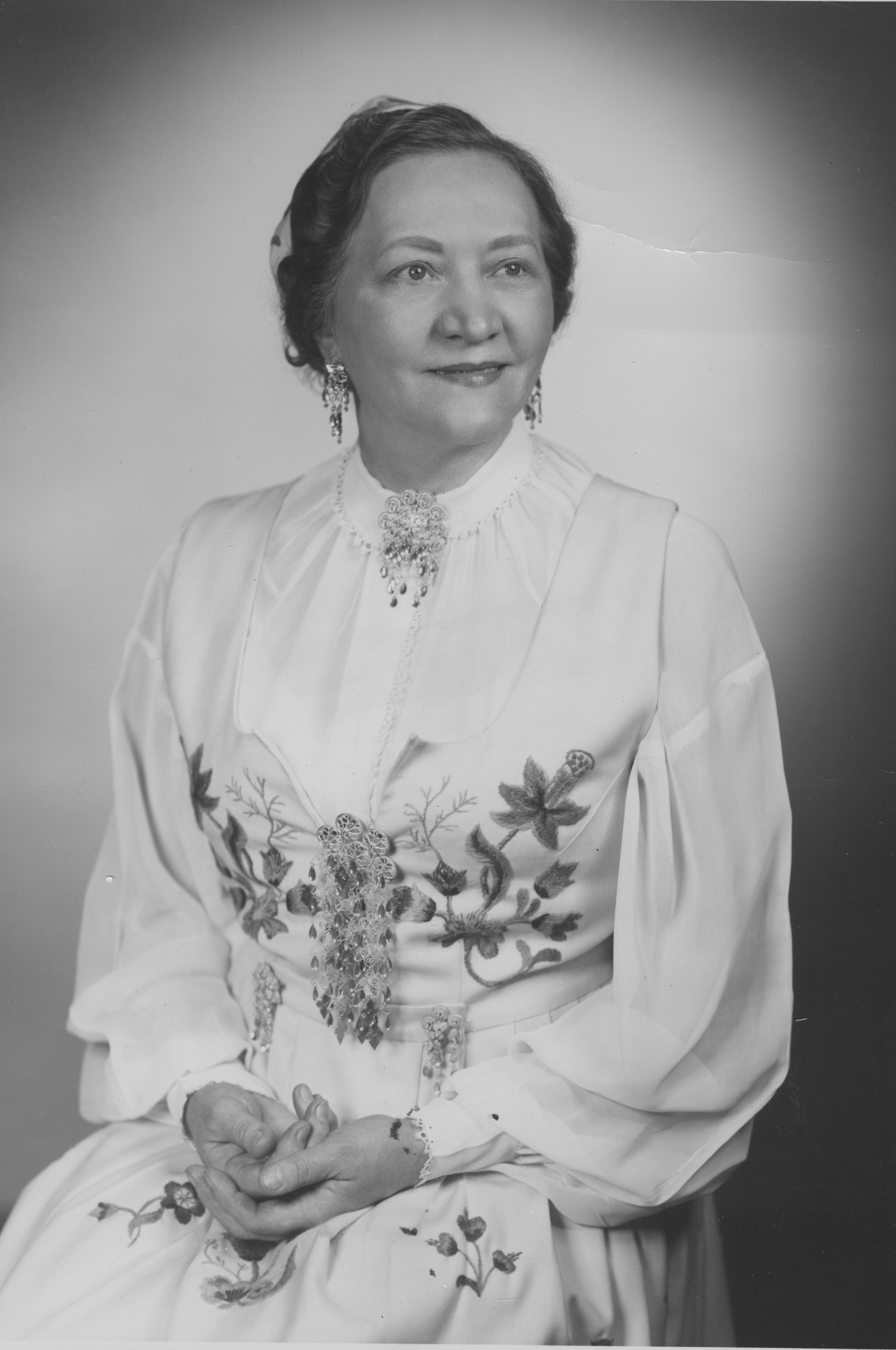
- Lyla M. Olson in a bunad
- Born: May 12, 1895; Pope County, Minnesota, US
- Died: January 25, 1964 (aged 68); Rochester, Minnesota, US
- Occupation: Nurse

Lyla Mae Olson (1895–1964) was an American nurse who wrote several books on practical public health and home nursing, including ways to make the equipment needed. She is best known in the 21st century as the inspiration for the "Olson mask," variants of which were one of the most popular cloth masks worn during the COVID-19 pandemic.

== Early life ==
Born May 12, 1895, in Pope County, Minnesota, Lyla Mae Olson was the second of nine children. Her parents, Axel Hagebert Olson and Ragnhild "Rosie" (Hoverud) Olson each immigrated with their families from Norway. Axel's family was living in Rolling Forks, Minnesota at the time of the 1885 Minnesota State Census. Ragnhild came with her family from Valdres, Norway, and by 1885, was living in Langhei, Minnesota.

Axel and Ragnhild Olson were living in Benson, MN in 1900 with four children: Myrtle, Leila (Lyla), Leonora, and Hazel. Axel's occupation is listed as "machinery salesman." By 1905, the Olson family had grown by three more children — Helen, Esther, and Clifford — and Axel's father, Ole S. Olson, had also moved in with them.

By 1910, the Olsons had moved to White Bear Lake, MN and had another son, Arthur. By 1920 the Olsons had moved to their final home in Glenwood, MN where their ninth child, Licele, was born, and Axel was working as a policeman.

Even though her family moved around quite a bit, it is clear Lyla had regular access to education considering her career in nursing and copious writing career.

== Nursing career ==
Olson attended nursing school at the Ancker Hospital School of Nursing in St. Paul, MN. By 1923, Olson was the Superintendent of Nurses at the Kahler Hospital in the Mayo Clinic system and was also involved in running the Methodist-Kahler School of Nursing (1917–1970), which was one of the schools that fed nurses into the Mayo Clinic. She is credited with designing their pin and cap and was responsible for the hiring of several of the school's directors, including Irene English Countryman. By 1926, Olson was Superintendent of Nurses at the Worrall Hospital, a major part of the Mayo Medical Center.

Olson published several articles and books in the 1930s-1940s about the practice of nursing, many detailing methods to make equipment such as preparation baskets for surgical procedures and medicine cabinets containing reference information for nurses about new drugs. In her 1947 book Improvised Equipment in the Home Care of the Sick, Olson compiled more than 400 nursing innovations she had tested that could all be made using materials commonly found in patients' homes – a practice known at the time as "improvising," now often called "making."

== Publications ==
=== Articles ===
- Olson, L. (1932). "A Handy Medicine Cabinet: Some Newer Drugs". The American Journal of Nursing. 32 (9): 957–958. doi:10.2307/3410924. JSTOR 3410924.
- Olson, L. (1933). "Oxygen Therapy: History, Administration, and Nursing Aspects". The American Journal of Nursing. 33 (3): 187–196. doi:10.2307/3412470. JSTOR 3412470.
- Olson, L. (1939). "The Surgical Field". The American Journal of Nursing. 39 (11): 1213–1216. doi:10.2307/3413470. JSTOR 3413470.
- Olson, L. (1941). "Myasthenia Gravis". The American Journal of Nursing. 41 (1): 57–62. doi:10.2307/3415203. JSTOR 3415203.

=== Books ===
- Taffy and Tuff (1942) - Olson co-authored this children's book with her companion, Mildred Seybert, about their two King Charles Spaniels that were known and loved by Mayo Clinic patients. Helen Keller wrote the foreword of the book and included a short essay, "Tribute to a Dog".
- Prevention, First Aid and Emergencies (1946)
- Improvised Equipment in the Home Care of the Sick (1947)
- A Nurses' Handbook for Hospital, Schools, and Home (1960)

== Death ==
Olson died in Rochester, MN on January 25, 1964, and is buried in Grandview Memorial Gardens Cemetery under a double headstone with her longtime housemate and companion, Mildred Seybert.
