= Barsness =

Barsness may refer to:

== People ==
- Edward E. Barsness (1891-1982), American newspaper editor and politician
- Nellie Barsness (1873-1966), American physician and temperance worker

== Places ==
=== United States ===
- Barsness Lake, a lake in Douglas County, Minnesota
- Barsness Township, Pope County, Minnesota
