= Minnewaska =

Minnewaska may refer to:

- Lake Minnewaska (disambiguation)
- Minnewaska State Park Preserve
- Minnewaska Township, Pope County, Minnesota
- SS Minnewaska (disambiguation)
