= Minnesota State Highway 114 =

State highway in Minnesota, United States

Trunk Highway 114
- MN 114 highlighted in red

Route information
- Maintained by MnDOT
- Length: 19.955 mi (32.114 km)
- Existed: April 22, 1933–present

Major junctions
- South end: MN 28 / MN 29 at Starbuck
- MN 55 at Lowry; MN 27 at La Grand Township
- North end: I-94 / US 52 / CR 40 near Alexandria

Location
- Country: United States
- State: Minnesota
- Counties: Pope, Douglas

Highway system
- Minnesota Trunk Highway System; Interstate; US; State; Legislative; Scenic
← MN 113	→ MN 115

Minnesota State Highway 114 (MN 114) is a 19.955-mile-long (32.114 km) highway in west-central Minnesota, which runs from its intersection with State Highways 28 and 29 in Starbuck and continues north to its northern terminus at its interchange with Interstate 94/US Highway 52 near the city of Alexandria.

== Route description ==
Highway 114 serves as a north–south route in west-central Minnesota between Starbuck, Lowry, and La Grand Township near Alexandria.

Highway 114 parallels State Highway 29 throughout its route. Highway 114 also intersects with Highway 29 at its southern terminus in Starbuck.

The route runs concurrent briefly with State Highway 55 on the northern edge of Lowry.

The route is legally defined as Route 208 in the Minnesota Statutes. It is not marked with this number.

A roundabout is scheduled to be built at State Highway 27 in 2025; currently the intersection is an all way stop.

== History ==
Highway 114 was authorized on April 22, 1933.

The highway originally served the city of Garfield, per its legal definition. When U.S. 52 was replaced by I-94, Highway 114 was truncated to end at the interstate.

By 1960, Highway 114 was paved between Highways 28 / 29 at Starbuck and State Highway 27 at La Grand Township. The route is completely paved today.

== Major intersections ==
County	Location	mi	km	Destinations	Notes
Pope	Starbuck	0.000	0.000	MN 28 / MN 29 / Glacial Ridge Trail – Glenwood, Morris, Benson	
Pope	Lowry	6.595	10.614	MN 55 east – Glenwood	Eastern end of MN 55 overlap
Pope	Ben Wade Township	7.258	11.681	MN 55 west – Hoffman	Western end of MN 55 overlap
Douglas	La Grand Township	17.693	28.474	MN 27 / I-94 Alt. east – Alexandria, Hoffman	
Douglas	La Grand Township	19.846– 19.955	31.939– 32.114	I-94 (US 52) / CSAH 40 north – Alexandria, Fergus Falls, Garfield	Interchange; I-94 Exit 97
1.000 mi = 1.609 km; 1.000 km = 0.621 mi: Concurrency terminus
