= Minnewaska Area High School =

Location
- 25122 State Hwy. 28; MN 56334; United States
- Coordinates: 45.6249°N 95.4552°W

Information
- Type: Public High School
- Established: 1990
- Superintendent: Chip Rankin
- Principal: Nate Meissner
- Teaching staff: 26.01 (FTE)
- Grades: 9–12
- Enrollment: 424 (2023-2024)
- Student to teacher ratio: 16.30
- Campus type: Rural
- Color(s): Blue, Green and Silver
- Mascot: Shark
- Feeder schools: Minnewaska Area Elementary School, Minnewaska Area Middle School, Minnewaska Area Junior High School
- Website: www.minnewaska.k12.mn.us

Minnewaska Area High School is a public school for grades 9–12 located between Starbuck and Glenwood Minnesota. The school mascot is the Lakers. Minnewaska is a member of the West Central Conference.

The Minnewaska Area School District #2149 was consolidated in 1993 from three Pope County districts: Glenwood/Lowry, Starbuck, and Villard. Consolidation came after several years of cooperation that resulted in the building of the Minnewaska Area High School in 1991 that now serves about three quarters of the county. The Minnewaska Area High School was constructed at a cost of $16,500,000, funded partially with a $6,000,000 grant from the State of Minnesota.
