= Amelia Lake =

Lake in the state of Minnesota, United States

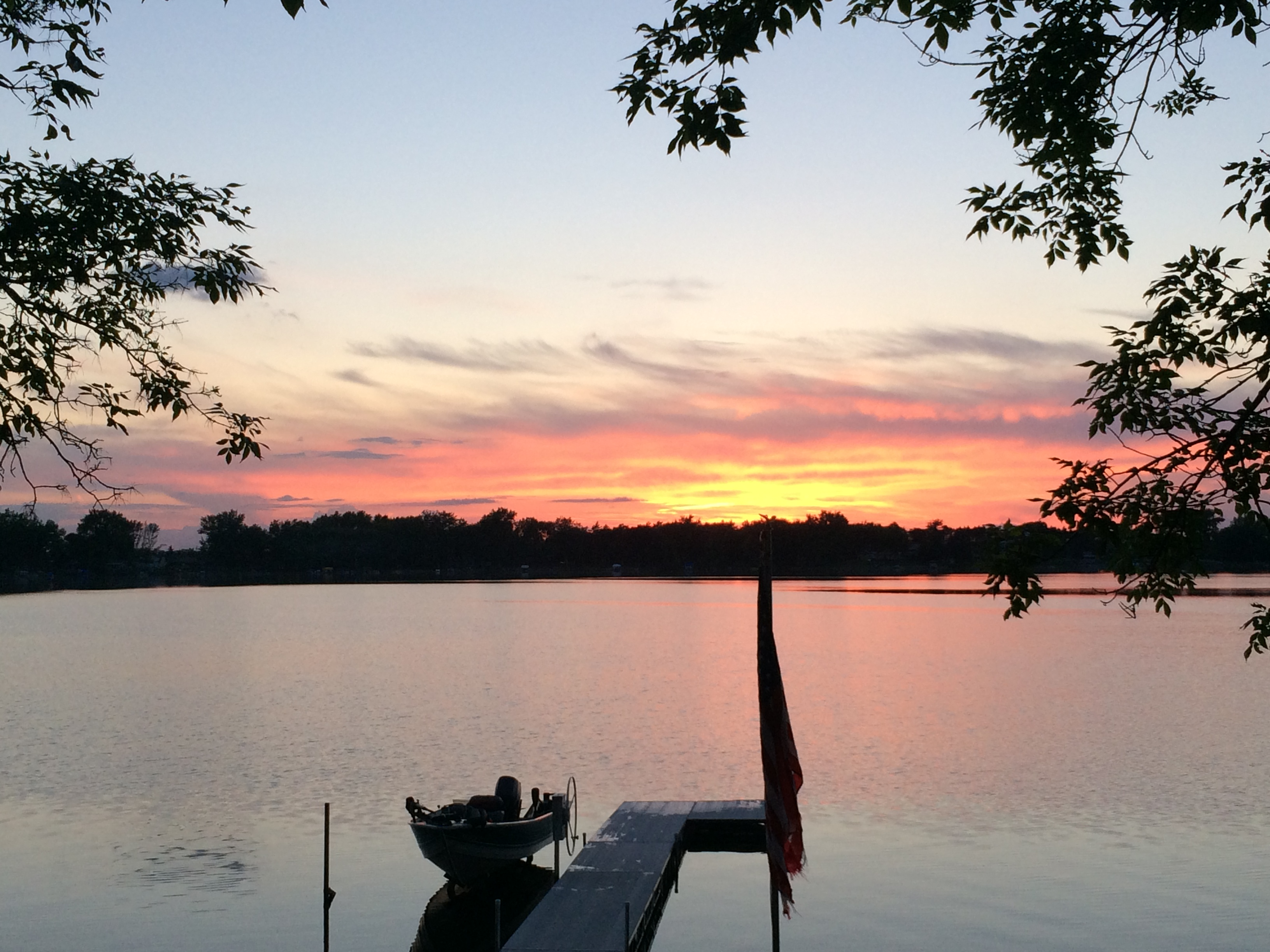
- Taken from the East side of Amelia Lake during June 2014.

- Location within Minnesota
- Location: Pope County, Minnesota
- Coordinates: 45°41′7.58″N 95°17′16.9″W
- Type: lake
- Primary outflows: Chippewa River (east branch)
- Max. depth: 69 feet (21 m)
- Surface elevation: 1,348 feet (411 m)

Amelia Lake is a lake in Pope County, Minnesota, the United States, located 6.7 miles away from Glenwood. Amelia lake has an elevation of around 1,348 feet (411 m). The lake sits on a lot of 910 acres. The depth of Amelia Lake is 69 feet (21 m) and water clarity can approach 12 feet (3.7 m) during the summer. This lake is open to the public to fish with a proper fishing license.

The lake is not the same as Lake Nokomis, which was also called "Lake Amelia" from at least 1823 until 1910, when its name was changed to that of the grandmother of Hiawatha.

== Hydrography ==
Lake Amelia is the last in a chain of three lakes, the other two being Leven Lake and Villard Lake. Amelia is the source of the east branch of the Chippewa River.

== Fishing ==
Lake Amelia offers many different types of fish. Some of the fish at Amelia Lake include: Black Bullhead, Black Crappie, Bluegill, Brown Bullhead, Largemouth Bass, Northern Pike, Pumpkinseed, Rock Bass, Walleye, White Sucker, Yellow Bullhead and Yellow Perch. Chinese mystery snails have been found in Amelia Lake. Minnesota Statue requires boaters to thoroughly check their boats and equipment before entering and leaving the lake.

== Stocking ==
Walleye is the only species that is being stocked in Amelia Lake. Since 2004, they have been continuously stocking the lake's water. They have been stocking fingerlings, yearlings, and fry. The last year that the lake was stocked was 2012. For more information, go to Minnesota Department of Natural Resources.
