= Edward E. Barsness =

American politician (1891–1982)

Edward E. Barsness (July 25, 1891 – January 11, 1982) was an American newspaper editor and politician.

Barsness was born in Barsness Township, Pope County, Minnesota and went to Starbuck High School in Starbuck, Minnesota. He served in the United States Army during World War I. Barsness lived in Glenwood, Minnesota with his wife and family and was the editor and manager of the Pope County Tribune. He served as mayor of Glenwood, Minnesota from 1924 to 1928 and also served as the probate judge from 1932 to 1945. Barsness also served as the deputy register of the Minnesota Department of Transportation from 1956 to 1959. He served in the Minnesota House of Representatives in 1927 and 1928 and in 1961 and 1962. Barsness died at the Glenwood Retirement Home in Glenwood, Minnesota and was buried in the Barsness Family Cemetery in Barsness Township.
