= Signalness =

Signalness may refer to:

- Signalness Creek, Pope County, Minnesota
- Signalness Lake, Pope County, Minnesota
