= Long Beach, Minnesota =

City in Minnesota, United States

Long Beach
- City
- Location of Long Beach, Minnesota
- Coordinates: 45°39′03″N 95°25′47″W
- Country: United States
- State: Minnesota
- County: Pope
- Incorporated: May 18, 1938

Government
  - Mayor: Mike Pfeiffer
  - Council: Will Harvey; Patia Jensen; Heather Kent; Bill Mills

Area
  - Total: 1.56 sq mi (4.03 km^{2})
  - Land: 1.42 sq mi (3.69 km^{2})
  - Water: 0.13 sq mi (0.34 km^{2})
- Elevation: 1,139 ft (347 m)

Population (2020)
  - Total: 338
  - Estimate (2021): 341
  - Density: 237.1/sq mi (91.54/km^{2})
- Time zone: UTC-6 (Central)
  - Summer (DST): UTC-5 (CDT)
- ZIP code: 56334
- Area code: 320
- FIPS code: 27-37970
- GNIS feature ID: 2395753
- Website: longbeachmn.com

Long Beach is a city in Pope County, Minnesota, United States. The population was 338 at the 2020 census.

== Geography ==
According to the United States Census Bureau, the city has a total area of 1.57 square miles (4.07 km^{2}), of which 1.45 square miles (3.76 km^{2}) is land and 0.12 square miles (0.31 km^{2}) is water.

Long Beach is immediately west of Glenwood, Minnesota on Minnesota State Highway 28 and is on the north shore of Lake Minnewaska.

Minnesota State Highways 28 and 29 (co-signed) serve as a main route in Long Beach.

== Demographics ==
Historical population
| Census | Pop. | Note | %± |
|---|---|---|---|
| 1940 | 119 | | — |
| 1950 | 181 | | 52.1% |
| 1960 | 236 | | 30.4% |
| 1970 | 219 | | −7.2% |
| 1980 | 263 | | 20.1% |
| 1990 | 204 | | −22.4% |
| 2000 | 271 | | 32.8% |
| 2010 | 335 | | 23.6% |
| 2020 | 338 | | 0.9% |
| 2021 (est.) | 341 | | 0.9% |
U.S. Decennial Census; 2020 Census

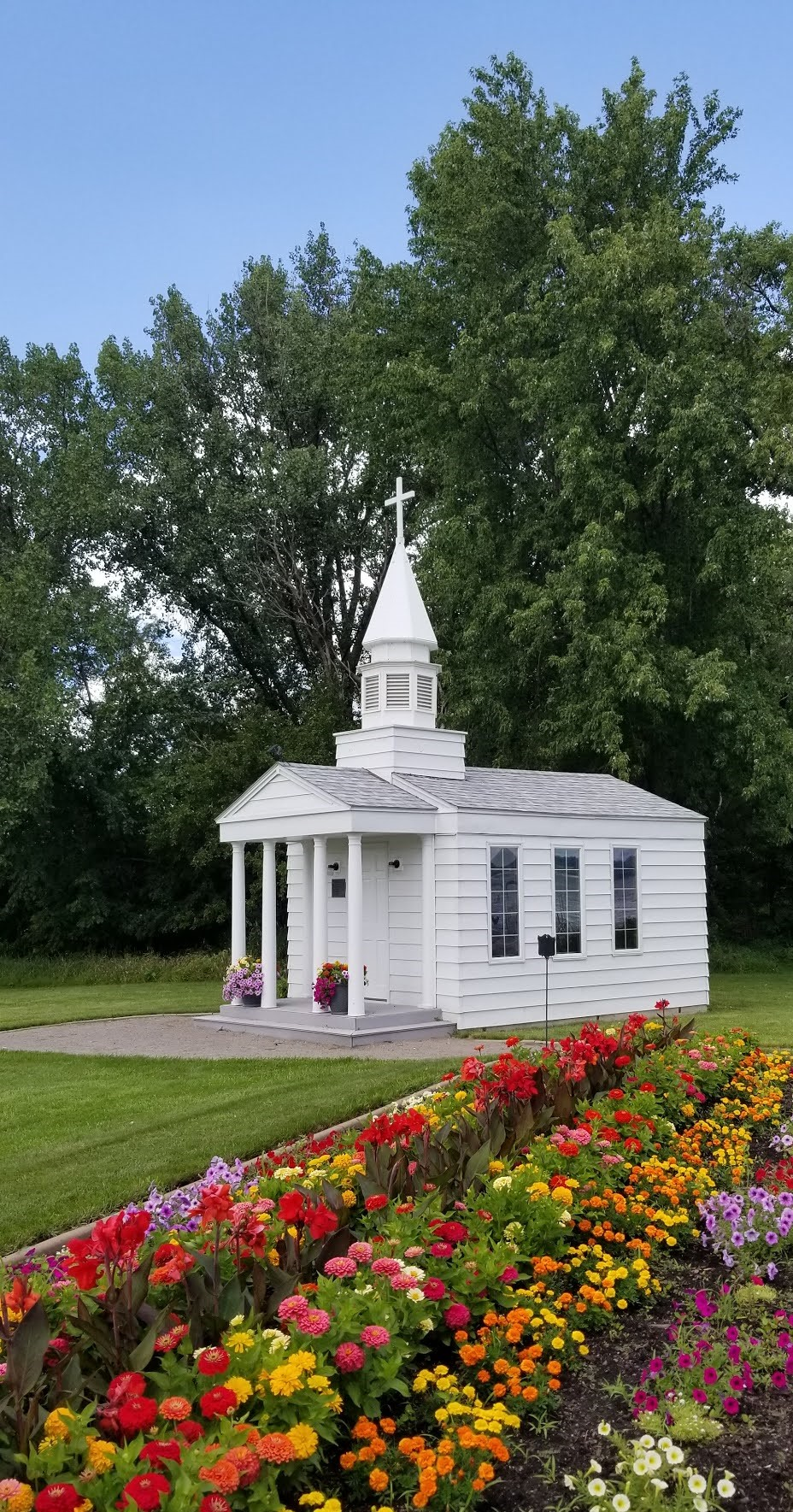
Morning Glory Gardens and chapel in Long Beach, Minnesota (2020)

=== 2010 census ===
As of the census of 2010, there were 335 people, 147 households, and 109 families living in the city. The population density was 231.0 inhabitants per square mile (89.2/km^{2}). There were 269 housing units at an average density of 185.5 per square mile (71.6/km^{2}). The racial makeup of the city was 98.5% White, 0.3% Pacific Islander, 0.3% from other races, and 0.9% from two or more races. Hispanic or Latino of any race were 0.3% of the population.

There were 147 households, of which 24.5% had children under the age of 18 living with them, 68.0% were married couples living together, 4.8% had a female householder with no husband present, 1.4% had a male householder with no wife present, and 25.9% were non-families. 23.1% of all households were made up of individuals, and 10.2% had someone living alone who was 65 years of age or older. The average household size was 2.28 and the average family size was 2.65.

The median age in the city was 50.4 years. 19.1% of residents were under the age of 18; 4.6% were between the ages of 18 and 24; 17.7% were from 25 to 44; 37.1% were from 45 to 64; and 21.8% were 65 years of age or older. The gender makeup of the city was 50.1% male and 49.9% female.

=== 2000 census ===
As of the census of 2000, there were 271 people, 113 households, and 85 families living in the city. The population density was 180.3 inhabitants per square mile (69.6/km^{2}). There were 159 housing units at an average density of 105.8 per square mile (40.8/km^{2}). The racial makeup of the city was 100.00% White. Hispanic or Latino of any race were 0.74% of the population.

There were 113 households, out of which 30.1% had children under the age of 18 living with them, 65.5% were married couples living together, 10.6% had a female householder with no husband present, and 23.9% were non-families. 20.4% of all households were made up of individuals, and 12.4% had someone living alone who was 65 years of age or older. The average household size was 2.40 and the average family size was 2.76.

In the city, the population was spread out, with 23.6% under the age of 18, 4.4% from 18 to 24, 22.5% from 25 to 44, 23.2% from 45 to 64, and 26.2% who were 65 years of age or older. The median age was 45 years. For every 100 females, there were 93.6 males. For every 100 females age 18 and over, there were 91.7 males.

The median income for a household in the city was $55,000, and the median income for a family was $56,250. Males had a median income of $34,375 versus $22,813 for females. The per capita income for the city was $30,207. About 4.7% of families and 4.0% of the population were below the poverty line, including 2.9% of those under the age of eighteen and none of those 65 or over.
