= Outlet Creek (Minnesota) =

Stream in Pope County, Minnesota, U.S.

Coordinates: 45°31′34″N 95°35′29″W

Outlet Creek is a stream in Pope County, in the U.S. state of Minnesota.

Outlet Creek was so named from the fact it is a lake outlet.

== See also ==
- List of rivers of Minnesota
