= Loziene J. Lee =

American politician (1907–1999)

Member of the Minnesota House of Representatives from the 65th district 65B (1967–1972)
- In office 1961–1972

Personal details
- Born: March 18, 1907 Glenwood, Minnesota, U.S.
- Died: May 9, 1999 (aged 92) Bagley, Minnesota, U.S.
- Party: Democratic
- Occupation: Union representative

Loziene Julius Lee (March 18, 1907 – May 9, 1999) was an American politician and a trade unionist.

Lee was born in Glenwood, Pope County, Minnesota. He lived in Bagley, Clearwater County, Minnesota with his wife and family. Lee had gone to the Clearwater County public schools. Lee was a union representative for the operating engineers labor union and was involved with the Democratic Party. He served on the Bagley City Council from 1953 to 1958 and also served as Mayor of Bagley, Minnesota. Lee also served on the Clearwater County Commission from 1958 to 1960. He served in the Minnesota House of Representatives from 1961 to 1972. He then served on the University of Minnesota Board of Regents from 1972 to 1979. Lee died from heart failure at the Clearwater County Hospital in Bagley. His funeral and burial also took place in Bagley.
