= New Prairie, Minnesota =

Ghost town in Minnesota, United States

Coordinates: 45°36′30″N 95°38′30″W

New Prairie is a ghost town in New Prairie Township, Pope County, Minnesota, United States. It lies between the cities of Cyrus and Starbuck.

== History ==
The village of New Prairie had a post office from 1872 until 1883, and again from 1920 until 1946. New Prairie also had a station of the Northern Pacific Railroad.
