= Walden Township, Pope County, Minnesota =

Township in Minnesota, United States

Walden Township, Minnesota
- Township
- Location within the state of Minnesota Walden Township, Minnesota (the United States)
- Coordinates: 45°32′16″N 95°41′28″W
- Country: United States
- State: Minnesota
- County: Pope

Area
  - Total: 35.6 sq mi (92.2 km^{2})
  - Land: 32.9 sq mi (85.1 km^{2})
  - Water: 2.7 sq mi (7.1 km^{2})
- Elevation: 1,099 ft (335 m)

Population (2000)
  - Total: 201
  - Density: 6.2/sq mi (2.4/km^{2})
- Time zone: UTC-6 (Central (CST))
  - Summer (DST): UTC-5 (CDT)
- FIPS code: 27-67702
- GNIS feature ID: 0665898

Walden Township is a township in Pope County, Minnesota, United States. The population was 185 at the 2020 census.

According to Warren Upham, Walden Township was probably named after Walden Pond.

== Geography ==
According to the United States Census Bureau, the township has a total area of 35.6 square miles (92.2 km^{2}), of which 32.9 square miles (85.1 km^{2}) is land and 2.8 square miles (7.1 km^{2}) (7.75%) is water.

== Demographics ==
As of the census of 2000, there were 201 people, 67 households, and 54 families residing in the township. The population density was 6.1 people per square mile (2.4/km^{2}). There were 80 housing units at an average density of 2.4/sq mi (0.9/km^{2}). The racial makeup of the township was 100.00% White.

There were 67 households, out of which 38.8% had children under the age of 18 living with them, 77.6% were married couples living together, 3.0% had a female householder with no husband present, and 19.4% were non-families. 14.9% of all households were made up of individuals, and 9.0% had someone living alone who was 65 years of age or older. The average household size was 3.00 and the average family size was 3.43.

In the township the population was spread out, with 32.8% under the age of 18, 5.5% from 18 to 24, 21.4% from 25 to 44, 27.9% from 45 to 64, and 12.4% who were 65 years of age or older. The median age was 36 years. For every 100 females, there were 113.8 males. For every 100 females age 18 and over, there were 110.9 males.

The median income for a household in the township was $37,000, and the median income for a family was $42,500. Males had a median income of $29,688 versus $20,750 for females. The per capita income for the township was $15,066. About 3.7% of families and 8.6% of the population were below the poverty line, including 17.5% of those under the age of eighteen and 8.7% of those 65 or over.
