= Ben Wade (disambiguation) =

Ben Wade (1922–2002) was a Major League Baseball baseball player and scout.

Ben or Benjamin Wade may refer to:

- Ben Wade, character in the film 3:10 to Yuma
- Ben Wade, character in the film Key Largo
- Ben Wade (politician) (1883–1958), Australian politician
- Benjamin Wade (1800–1878), U.S. lawyer and United States senator
- Benjamin Wade (Survivor contestant) (born 1971), American reality television personality

== See also ==
- Ben Wade Township, Pope County, Minnesota
