= Bangor Township, Pope County, Minnesota =

Bangor Township, Minnesota
- Township
- Location within the state of Minnesota Bangor Township, Minnesota (the United States)
- Coordinates: 45°32′47″N 95°10′50″W
- Country: United States
- State: Minnesota
- County: Pope

Area
  - Total: 35.1 sq mi (90.9 km^{2})
  - Land: 35.1 sq mi (90.8 km^{2})
  - Water: 0.039 sq mi (0.1 km^{2})
- Elevation: 1,322 ft (403 m)

Population (2000)
  - Total: 217
  - Density: 6.2/sq mi (2.4/km^{2})
- Time zone: UTC-6 (Central (CST))
  - Summer (DST): UTC-5 (CDT)
- FIPS code: 27-03502
- GNIS feature ID: 0663503

Bangor Township is a township in Pope County, Minnesota, United States. The population was 164 at the 2020 census.

According to Warren Upham, the township may be named after Bangor, Maine.

== Geography ==
According to the United States Census Bureau, the township has a total area of 35.1 square miles (91 km^{2}), of which 35.0 square miles (91 km^{2}) is land and 0.1 square miles (0.26 km^{2}) (0.17%) is water.

== Demographics ==
As of the census of 2000, there were 217 people, 66 households, and 50 families residing in the township. The population density was 6.2 inhabitants per square mile (2.4/km^{2}). There were 77 housing units at an average density of 2.2 per square mile (0.85/km^{2}). The racial makeup of the township was 97.70% White, 0.92% Native American, and 1.38% from two or more races. Hispanic or Latino of any race were 0.46% of the population.

There were 66 households, out of which 42.4% had children under the age of 18 living with them, 72.7% were married couples living together, and 24.2% were non-families. 19.7% of all households were made up of individuals, and 12.1% had someone living alone who was 65 years of age or older. The average household size was 3.29 and the average family size was 3.88.

In the township the population was spread out, with 36.9% under the age of 18, 8.8% from 18 to 24, 27.2% from 25 to 44, 17.5% from 45 to 64, and 9.7% who were 65 years of age or older. The median age was 32 years. For every 100 females, there were 114.9 males. For every 100 females age 18 and over, there were 101.5 males.

The median income for a household in the township was $38,125, and the median income for a family was $46,250. Males had a median income of $26,250 versus $23,750 for females. The per capita income for the township was $12,600. About 8.7% of families and 17.2% of the population were below the poverty line, including 22.5% of those under the age of eighteen and 22.2% of those 65 or over.
