= Westport Township =

Westport Township may refer to the following townships in the United States:

- Westport Township, Dickinson County, Iowa
- Westport Township, Pope County, Minnesota
