= Lake Minnewaska =

Lake Minnewaska may refer to:

- Lake Minnewaska (Minnesota)
- Lake Minnewaska (New York)
