= Pike Lake (Pope County, Minnesota) =

Lake in the state of Minnesota, United States

- Location within Minnesota
- Location: Pope County, Minnesota
- Coordinates: 45°44′44″N 95°38′29″W
- Type: lake

Pike Lake is a lake in Pope County, in the U.S. state of Minnesota.

Pike Lake was named for its stock of pike fish.

== See also ==
- List of lakes in Minnesota
