= Signalness Lake =

Lake in the state of Minnesota, United States

- Location within Minnesota
- Location: Pope County, Minnesota
- Coordinates: 45°32′27″N 95°31′19″W
- Type: lake

Signalness Lake is a lake in Pope County, in the U.S. state of Minnesota.

Signalness Lake was named for Olaus Signalness, a Norwegian settler.

== See also ==
- List of lakes in Minnesota
