= Grove Lake Township, Pope County, Minnesota =

Grove Lake Township, Minnesota
- Township
- Location within the state of Minnesota Grove Lake Township, Minnesota (the United States)
- Coordinates: 45°37′28″N 95°12′4″W
- Country: United States
- State: Minnesota
- County: Pope

Area
  - Total: 33.7 sq mi (87.3 km^{2})
  - Land: 32.0 sq mi (82.9 km^{2})
  - Water: 1.7 sq mi (4.5 km^{2})
- Elevation: 1,352 ft (412 m)

Population (2000)
  - Total: 268
  - Density: 8.3/sq mi (3.2/km^{2})
- Time zone: UTC-6 (Central (CST))
  - Summer (DST): UTC-5 (CDT)
- FIPS code: 27-26162
- GNIS feature ID: 0664360

Grove Lake Township is a township in Pope County, Minnesota, United States. The population was 271 at the 2020 census.

The township took its name from Grove Lake.

== History ==
The township was organized in 1866. Pope County's first school district was established in Grove Lake Township in 1877.

== Geography ==
According to the United States Census Bureau, the township has a total area of 33.7 square miles (87 km^{2}), of which 32.0 square miles (83 km^{2}) is land and 1.7 square miles (4.4 km^{2}) (5.10%) is water.

== Demographics ==
As of the census of 2000, there were 268 people, 102 households, and 77 families residing in the township. The population density was 8.4 inhabitants per square mile (3.2/km^{2}). There were 154 housing units at an average density of 4.8 per square mile (1.9/km^{2}). The racial makeup of the township was 100.00% White. Hispanic or Latino of any race were 2.24% of the population.

There were 102 households, out of which 27.5% had children under the age of 18 living with them, 68.6% were married couples living together, 2.0% had a female householder with no husband present, and 24.5% were non-families. 21.6% of all households were made up of individuals, and 12.7% had someone living alone who was 65 years of age or older. The average household size was 2.63 and the average family size was 2.94.

In the township the population was spread out, with 25.4% under the age of 18, 7.8% from 18 to 24, 21.3% from 25 to 44, 27.6% from 45 to 64, and 17.9% who were 65 years of age or older. The median age was 41 years. For every 100 females, there were 117.9 males. For every 100 females age 18 and over, there were 104.1 males.

The median income for a household in the township was $36,250, and the median income for a family was $42,083. Males had a median income of $30,625 versus $19,375 for females. The per capita income for the township was $16,170. About 7.6% of families and 9.5% of the population were below the poverty line, including 11.4% of those under the age of eighteen and 5.0% of those 65 or over.
