= Westport Township, Pope County, Minnesota =

Westport Township, Minnesota
- Township
- Location within the state of Minnesota Westport Township, Minnesota (the United States)
- Coordinates: 45°43′28″N 95°12′6″W
- Country: United States
- State: Minnesota
- County: Pope

Area
  - Total: 35.4 sq mi (91.8 km^{2})
  - Land: 34.6 sq mi (89.5 km^{2})
  - Water: 0.89 sq mi (2.3 km^{2})
- Elevation: 1,342 ft (409 m)

Population (2000)
  - Total: 279
  - Density: 8.0/sq mi (3.1/km^{2})
- Time zone: UTC-6 (Central (CST))
  - Summer (DST): UTC-5 (CDT)
- FIPS code: 27-69646
- GNIS feature ID: 0665970

Westport Township is a township in Pope County, Minnesota, United States. The population was 237 at the 2020 census. It contains the village of Westport, Minnesota.

== History ==
The township was surveyed in 1858. The first public building was a tavern on Westport Lake operated by the Drake Family.

The Little Falls and Dakota Railroad (later part of the Northern Pacific Railway) established a depot in 1882.

== Geography ==
According to the United States Census Bureau, the township has a total area of 35.4 square miles (91.8 km^{2}), of which 34.5 square miles (89.5 km^{2}) is land and 0.9 square mile (2.3 km^{2}) (2.48%) is water.

== Demographics ==
As of the census of 2000, there were 279 people, 83 households, and 68 families residing in the township. The population density was 8.1 people per square mile (3.1/km^{2}). There were 90 housing units at an average density of 2.6/sq mi (1.0/km^{2}). The racial makeup of the township was 99.28% White, and 0.72% from two or more races. Hispanic or Latino of any race were 1.08% of the population.

There were 83 households, out of which 47.0% had children under the age of 18 living with them, 78.3% were married couples living together, 2.4% had a female householder with no husband present, and 16.9% were non-families. 13.3% of all households were made up of individuals, and 6.0% had someone living alone who was 65 years of age or older. The average household size was 3.36 and the average family size was 3.72.

In the township the population was spread out, with 35.8% under the age of 18, 9.3% from 18 to 24, 26.2% from 25 to 44, 21.1% from 45 to 64, and 7.5% who were 65 years of age or older. The median age was 31 years. For every 100 females, there were 111.4 males. For every 100 females age 18 and over, there were 113.1 males.

The median income for a household in the township was $42,188, and the median income for a family was $44,250. Males had a median income of $31,667 versus $17,750 for females. The per capita income for the township was $14,185. About 13.6% of families and 13.2% of the population were below the poverty line, including 12.6% of those under the age of eighteen and 23.1% of those 65 or over.
