= Earl Hauge =

American politician and Lutheran minister

Earl Hauge (born October 18, 1940) is an American politician and Lutheran minister.

Hauge lived in Glenwood, Minnesota with his wife and family. He received his bachelor's degree in political science and history from Concordia College in Moorhead, Minnesota and his doctorate degree from Luther Seminary in Saint Paul, Minnesota. Hauge served as a Lutheran minister in Watson, Minnesota from 1967 to 1973. He served in the Minnesota House of Representatives in 1981 and 1982 and was a Democrat.
