= Nellie Barsness =

American physician (1873–1966)

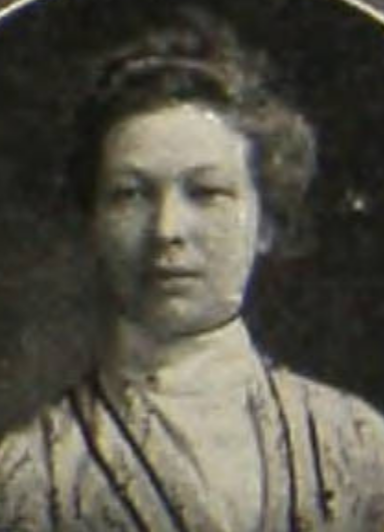
- Nellie Barsness, from the 1902 yearbook of the University of Minnesota
- Born: July 9, 1873; Pope County, Minnesota, U.S.
- Died: May 12, 1966 (aged 92); St. Paul, Minnesota, U.S.
- Occupation: Physician

Nellie Olea N. Barsness (July 9, 1873 – May 12, 1966) was an American physician and temperance worker, based in Minnesota. She was decorated by the French government for her work with gas-injured soldiers in France during and after World War I.

== Early life and education ==
Barsness was born on a farm in Barsness Township, Pope County, Minnesota, the daughter of Nels Nielson Barsness and Bertha (Betsy) O. Thoreson Barsness. Her parents were among the first Norwegian immigrant homesteaders in Minnesota; her father was also a Union Army veteran of the American Civil War. In January 1894, she enrolled at the Normal School at St. Cloud (today's St. Cloud State University) to become a teacher but did not graduate. She attended at least through the 1896/97 academic year. After teaching a few years, she trained as a physician at University of Minnesota Medical School, completing her medical degree in 1902.

== Career ==
Barsness was an ophthalmologist and otolaryngologist. She also attended the first conference on radiology, held in 1904 in Niagara Falls. During World War I, she went to France with the Women's Overseas Service League. She was stationed at Cempuis to treat soldiers wounded by gas attacks, and conducted clinics to relieve French doctors in Nancy and Theims. She was decorated by the French government with a Medaille d'Honneur, in recognition of her wartime service.

In Minnesota after the war, she was on the staff of the state women's reformatory at Shakopee, and active in the Women's Christian Temperance Union (WCTU), as the Minnesota chapter's health director. In 1940 she was elected president of the Minnesota Medical Women's Association. She was also active in the American Medical Women's Association, the Business and Professional Women's Association of St. Paul, and the YWCA. She marked her fiftieth anniversary in the medical profession in 1953, and was named "Doctor of the Year" by the Minnesota Medical Association in 1956. In 1958, she was guest editor of the Journal of the American Women's Medical Association, and contributed an essay to that issue, "Highlights in Careers of Women Physicians in Pioneer Minnesota."

Barsness and her sister Jennie were survivors of the 1903 Iroquois Theatre fire. Barsness held a patent for a sanitary toilet seat cover, issued in 1921.

== Personal life ==
After her war work, Barsness lived with her sister Thilda, a widow with a young son. When Thilda died in 1938, Barsness adopted her teenaged nephew Harry N. Simmonds, who also became an otolaryngologist. She died in 1966, aged 92 years, in St. Paul. Her old roll-top desk is in the collection of the Pope County Historical Society. The University of Minnesota Medical School has a Dr. Nellie N. Barsness Scholarship, endowed by Simmonds and given to outstanding female students.
