= Lake Johanna Township, Pope County, Minnesota =

Lake Johanna Township, Minnesota
- Township
- Location within the state of Minnesota Lake Johanna Township, Minnesota (the United States)
- Coordinates: 45°26′55″N 95°12′24″W
- Country: United States
- State: Minnesota
- County: Pope

Area
  - Total: 35.9 sq mi (92.9 km^{2})
  - Land: 33.2 sq mi (85.9 km^{2})
  - Water: 2.7 sq mi (7.0 km^{2})
- Elevation: 1,371 ft (418 m)

Population (2000)
  - Total: 151
  - Density: 4.7/sq mi (1.8/km^{2})
- Time zone: UTC-6 (Central (CST))
  - Summer (DST): UTC-5 (CDT)
- FIPS code: 27-34586
- GNIS feature ID: 0664684

Lake Johanna Township is a township in Pope County, Minnesota, United States. The population was 124 at the 2020 census.

== History ==
Lake Johanna Township was organized in 1867. The original federal land survey of the township was completed in 1867.

== Geography ==
According to the United States Census Bureau, the township has a total area of 35.8 square miles (93 km^{2}), of which 33.2 square miles (86 km^{2}) is land and 2.7 square miles (7.0 km^{2}) (7.50%) is water.

== Demographics ==
As of the census of 2000, there were 151 people, 64 households, and 43 families residing in the township. The population density was 4.6 inhabitants per square mile (1.8/km^{2}). There were 97 housing units at an average density of 2.9 per square mile (1.1/km^{2}). The racial makeup of the township was 98.01% White, and 1.99% from two or more races.

There were 64 households, out of which 25.0% had children under the age of 18 living with them, 60.9% were married couples living together, 4.7% had a female householder with no husband present, and 32.8% were non-families. 28.1% of all households were made up of individuals, and 18.8% had someone living alone who was 65 years of age or older. The average household size was 2.36 and the average family size was 2.91.

In the township the population was spread out, with 18.5% under the age of 18, 4.6% from 18 to 24, 24.5% from 25 to 44, 29.8% from 45 to 64, and 22.5% who were 65 years of age or older. The median age was 46 years. For every 100 females, there were 109.7 males. For every 100 females age 18 and over, there were 127.8 males.

The median income for a household in the township was $32,813, and the median income for a family was $45,000. Males had a median income of $25,833 versus $21,875 for females. The per capita income for the township was $17,270. There were 4.8% of families and 11.9% of the population living below the poverty line, including 19.0% of under eighteens and 16.7% of those over 64.
