= Minnewaska Township, Pope County, Minnesota =

Minnewaska Township, Minnesota
- Township
- Location within the state of Minnesota Minnewaska Township, Minnesota (the United States)
- Coordinates: 45°39′9″N 95°27′41″W
- Country: United States
- State: Minnesota
- County: Pope

Area
  - Total: 25.4 sq mi (65.8 km^{2})
  - Land: 12.8 sq mi (33.2 km^{2})
  - Water: 12.6 sq mi (32.6 km^{2})
- Elevation: 1,178 ft (359 m)

Population (2000)
  - Total: 504
  - Density: 39/sq mi (15.2/km^{2})
- Time zone: UTC-6 (Central (CST))
  - Summer (DST): UTC-5 (CDT)
- FIPS code: 27-43342
- GNIS feature ID: 0664999

Minnewaska Township is a township in Pope County, Minnesota, United States. The population was 513 at the 2020 census.

The township took its name from Lake Minnewaska.

== History ==
The township was surveyed in 1859 and organized in 1884.

== Geography ==
According to the United States Census Bureau, the township has a total area of 25.4 square miles (65.8 km^{2}), of which 12.8 square miles (33.2 km^{2}) is land and 12.6 square miles (32.6 km^{2}) (49.57%) is water.

== Demographics ==
As of the census of 2000, there were 504 people, 202 households, and 160 families residing in the township. The population density was 39.3 inhabitants per square mile (15.2/km^{2}). There were 356 housing units at an average density of 27.8 per square mile (10.7/km^{2}). The racial makeup of the township was 99.01% White, 0.60% Asian, and 0.40% from two or more races.

There were 202 households, out of which 30.2% had children under the age of 18 living with them, 73.3% were married couples living together, 5.4% had a female householder with no husband present, and 20.3% were non-families. 17.8% of all households were made up of individuals, and 8.4% had someone living alone who was 65 years of age or older. The average household size was 2.50 and the average family size was 2.83.

In the township the population was spread out, with 23.4% under the age of 18, 6.3% from 18 to 24, 20.2% from 25 to 44, 31.0% from 45 to 64, and 19.0% who were 65 years of age or older. The median age was 45 years. For every 100 females, there were 118.2 males. For every 100 females age 18 and over, there were 106.4 males.

The median income for a household in the township was $38,000, and the median income for a family was $47,500. Males had a median income of $30,357 versus $22,500 for females. The per capita income for the township was $19,838. About 6.4% of families and 7.1% of the population were below the poverty line, including 7.4% of those under age 18 and 13.1% of those age 65 or over.
