= Hoff Township, Pope County, Minnesota =

Hoff Township, Minnesota
- Township
- Location within the state of Minnesota Hoff Township, Minnesota (the United States)
- Coordinates: 45°27′33″N 95°41′29″W
- Country: United States
- State: Minnesota
- County: Pope

Area
  - Total: 36.0 sq mi (93.2 km^{2})
  - Land: 35.9 sq mi (93.1 km^{2})
  - Water: 0 sq mi (0.0 km^{2})
- Elevation: 1,070 ft (326 m)

Population (2000)
  - Total: 195
  - Density: 5.4/sq mi (2.1/km^{2})
- Time zone: UTC-6 (Central (CST))
  - Summer (DST): UTC-5 (CDT)
- FIPS code: 27-29456
- GNIS feature ID: 0664490

Hoff Township is a township in Pope County, Minnesota, United States. The population was 162 at the 2020 census.

Hoff Township was named after Hof Municipality in the old Hedmark county in Norway.

== Geography ==
According to the United States Census Bureau, the township has a total area of 36.0 square miles (93 km^{2}), of which 36.0 square miles (93 km^{2}) is land and 0.03% is water.

== Demographics ==
As of the census of 2000, there were 195 people, 61 households, and 53 families residing in the township. The population density was 5.4 inhabitants per square mile (2.1/km^{2}). There were 65 housing units at an average density of 1.8 per square mile (0.69/km^{2}). The racial makeup of the township was 92.82% White, 4.10% African American, 1.54% from other races, and 1.54% from two or more races. Hispanic or Latino of any race were 2.56% of the population.

There were 61 households, out of which 42.6% had children under the age of 18 living with them, 75.4% were married couples living together, 6.6% had a female householder with no husband present, and 13.1% were non-families. 9.8% of all households were made up of individuals, and 3.3% had someone living alone who was 65 years of age or older. The average household size was 3.20 and the average family size was 3.42.

In the township the population was spread out, with 34.4% under the age of 18, 8.7% from 18 to 24, 21.5% from 25 to 44, 23.6% from 45 to 64, and 11.8% who were 65 years of age or older. The median age was 38 years. For every 100 females, there were 114.3 males. For every 100 females age 18 and over, there were 106.5 males.

The median income for a household in the township was $41,667, and the median income for a family was $42,292. Males had a median income of $31,607 versus $15,000 for females. The per capita income for the township was $15,496. About 5.9% of families and 7.7% of the population were below the poverty line, including 15.3% of those under the age of eighteen and 8.7% of those 65 or over.
