= White Bear Lake Township, Pope County, Minnesota =

White Bear Lake Township, Minnesota
- Township
- Location within the state of Minnesota White Bear Lake Township, Minnesota (the United States)
- Coordinates: 45°37′53″N 95°34′14″W
- Country: United States
- State: Minnesota
- County: Pope

Area
  - Total: 34.6 sq mi (89.6 km^{2})
  - Land: 32.7 sq mi (84.8 km^{2})
  - Water: 1.9 sq mi (4.8 km^{2})
- Elevation: 1,280 ft (390 m)

Population (2000)
  - Total: 440
  - Density: 13/sq mi (5.2/km^{2})
- Time zone: UTC-6 (Central (CST))
  - Summer (DST): UTC-5 (CDT)
- FIPS code: 27-69952
- GNIS feature ID: 0665982

White Bear Lake Township is a township in Pope County, Minnesota, United States. The population was 469 at the 2020 census.

The township was named for White Bear, an Ojibwe chief, who is buried there near a lake shore.

== History ==
The township was surveyed in 1866 and organized in 1869. The Wadsworth Trail from St. Cloud, Minnesota to Fort Wadsworth ran through the township.

White Bear Lake Township contains the city of Starbuck, Minnesota.

== Geography ==
According to the United States Census Bureau, the township has a total area of 34.6 square miles (89.6 km^{2}), of which 32.7 square miles (84.8 km^{2}) is land and 1.9 square miles (4.8 km^{2}) (5.38%) is water.

== Demographics ==
As of the census of 2000, there were 440 people, 162 households, and 131 families residing in the township. The population density was 13.4 people per square mile (5.2/km^{2}). There were 234 housing units at an average density of 7.1/sq mi (2.8/km^{2}). The racial makeup of the township was 99.32% White and 0.68% from two or more races. Hispanic or Latino of any race were 0.23% of the population.

There were 162 households, out of which 37.0% had children under the age of 18 living with them, 75.3% were married couples living together, 1.9% had a female householder with no husband present, and 19.1% were non-families. 18.5% of all households were made up of individuals, and 9.9% had someone living alone who was 65 years of age or older. The average household size was 2.69 and the average family size was 3.07.

In the township the population was spread out, with 28.0% under the age of 18, 4.3% from 18 to 24, 25.0% from 25 to 44, 26.4% from 45 to 64, and 16.4% who were 65 years of age or older. The median age was 43 years. For every 100 females, there were 110.5 males. For every 100 females age 18 and over, there were 109.9 males.

The median income for a household in the township was $46,250, and the median income for a family was $49,583. Males had a median income of $29,688 versus $21,250 for females. The per capita income for the township was $18,864. About 7.3% of families and 6.3% of the population were below the poverty line, including 2.7% of those under the age of 18 and 18.8% of those 65 and older.
