= West Central Conference (Minnesota) =

- Region: Minnesota

The West Central Conference is a high school athletic conference made up of 11 high schools (in two divisions) in Minnesota.

== North Division ==
- Melrose Area High School
- Minnewaska Area High School
- Morris Area Schools
- Paynesville High School
- Sauk Centre High School

== South Division ==
- Atwater-Cosmos-Grove City High School
- Benson High School
- BOLD High School
- Lac Qui Parle Valley High School
- Montevideo High School
- Yellow Medicine East High School
