= Signalness Creek =

Stream in Pope County, Minnesota, U.S.

Coordinates: 45°32′46″N 95°34′02″W

Signalness Creek is a stream in Pope County, in the U.S. state of Minnesota.

Signalness Creek was named for Olaus Signalness, a Norwegian settler.

== See also ==
- List of rivers of Minnesota
