= Lowry, Minnesota =

City in Minnesota, United States

Lowry
- City
- Location of Lowry, Minnesota
- Coordinates: 45°42′18″N 95°31′09″W
- Country: United States
- State: Minnesota
- County: Pope
- Founded: March 1887
- Incorporated: May 5, 1896

Government
  - Mayor: Dan Sutton
  - Council: Kristi Kramber; Virgil Coziahr; Patricia McCrory; DJ Ashler

Area
  - Total: 0.45 sq mi (1.17 km^{2})
  - Land: 0.45 sq mi (1.17 km^{2})
  - Water: 0 sq mi (0.00 km^{2})
- Elevation: 1,368 ft (417 m)

Population (2020)
  - Total: 334
  - Estimate (2021): 339
  - Density: 738.2/sq mi (285.02/km^{2})
- Time zone: UTC-6 (Central)
  - Summer (DST): UTC-5 (CDT)
- ZIP code: 56349
- Area code: 320
- FIPS code: 27-38366
- GNIS feature ID: 2395778
- Website: cityoflowrymn.com

Lowry is a city in Pope County, Minnesota, United States. The population was 334 at the 2020 census.

== History ==
Lowry was platted in March 1887, and named for Thomas Lowry, a railroad official. A post office has been in operation at Lowry since 1887.

== Geography ==
According to the United States Census Bureau, the city has a total area of 0.37 square miles (0.96 km^{2}), all land.

Minnesota State Highways 55 and 114 are two of the main routes in the community.

== Demographics ==
Historical population
| Census | Pop. | Note | %± |
|---|---|---|---|
| 1900 | 260 | | — |
| 1910 | 252 | | −3.1% |
| 1920 | 225 | | −10.7% |
| 1930 | 272 | | 20.9% |
| 1940 | 273 | | 0.4% |
| 1950 | 285 | | 4.4% |
| 1960 | 294 | | 3.2% |
| 1970 | 257 | | −12.6% |
| 1980 | 283 | | 10.1% |
| 1990 | 233 | | −17.7% |
| 2000 | 271 | | 16.3% |
| 2010 | 299 | | 10.3% |
| 2020 | 334 | | 11.7% |
| 2021 (est.) | 339 | | 1.5% |
U.S. Decennial Census; 2020 Census

=== 2010 census ===
As of the census of 2010, there were 299 people, 130 households, and 83 families living in the city. The population density was 808.1 inhabitants per square mile (312.0/km^{2}). There were 141 housing units at an average density of 381.1 per square mile (147.1/km^{2}). The racial makeup of the city was 98.0% White, 0.3% Pacific Islander, and 1.7% from two or more races. Hispanic or Latino of any race were 0.3% of the population.

There were 130 households, of which 29.2% had children under the age of 18 living with them, 52.3% were married couples living together, 7.7% had a female householder with no husband present, 3.8% had a male householder with no wife present, and 36.2% were non-families. 32.3% of all households were made up of individuals, and 14.6% had someone living alone who was 65 years of age or older. The average household size was 2.30 and the average family size was 2.90.

The median age in the city was 35.6 years. 23.4% of residents were under the age of 18; 7.7% were between the ages of 18 and 24; 28.2% were from 25 to 44; 25.1% were from 45 to 64; and 15.7% were 65 years of age or older. The gender makeup of the city was 50.8% male and 49.2% female.

=== 2000 census ===
As of the census of 2000, there were 271 people, 110 households, and 76 families living in the city. The population density was 729.7 inhabitants per square mile (281.7/km^{2}). There were 122 housing units at an average density of 328.5 per square mile (126.8/km^{2}). The racial makeup of the city was 96.68% White, 1.48% Native American, 0.37% from other races, and 1.48% from two or more races. Hispanic or Latino of any race were 0.74% of the population.

There were 110 households, out of which 30.9% had children under the age of 18 living with them, 57.3% were married couples living together, 8.2% had a female householder with no husband present, and 30.9% were non-families. 27.3% of all households were made up of individuals, and 14.5% had someone living alone who was 65 years of age or older. The average household size was 2.46 and the average family size was 2.96.

In the city, the population was spread out, with 25.5% under the age of 18, 10.0% from 18 to 24, 20.7% from 25 to 44, 24.4% from 45 to 64, and 19.6% who were 65 years of age or older. The median age was 40 years. For every 100 females, there were 100.7 males. For every 100 females age 18 and over, there were 100.0 males.

The median income for a household in the city was $31,591, and the median income for a family was $35,000. Males had a median income of $28,472 versus $18,125 for females. The per capita income for the city was $16,234. About 2.9% of families and 3.6% of the population were below the poverty line, including none of those under the age of eighteen and 4.1% of those 65 or over.
