= Rolling Forks Township, Pope County, Minnesota =

Rolling Forks Township, Minnesota
- Township
- Location within the state of Minnesota Rolling Forks Township, Minnesota (the United States)
- Coordinates: 45°26′36″N 95°26′5″W
- Country: United States
- State: Minnesota
- County: Pope

Area
  - Total: 35.9 sq mi (92.9 km^{2})
  - Land: 34.6 sq mi (89.7 km^{2})
  - Water: 1.2 sq mi (3.2 km^{2})
- Elevation: 1,184 ft (361 m)

Population (2000)
  - Total: 160
  - Density: 4.7/sq mi (1.8/km^{2})
- Time zone: UTC-6 (Central (CST))
  - Summer (DST): UTC-5 (CDT)
- FIPS code: 27-55240
- GNIS feature ID: 0665446

Rolling Forks Township is a township in Pope County, Minnesota, United States. The population was 118 at the 2020 census.

Rolling Forks Township was named for its rolling hills and forks of its river.

== Geography ==
According to the United States Census Bureau, the township has a total area of 35.9 square miles (93.0 km^{2}), of which 34.6 square miles (89.7 km^{2}) is land and 1.2 square miles (3.2 km^{2}) (3.45%) is water.

== Demographics ==
As of the census of 2000, there were 160 people, 57 households, and 42 families residing in the township. The population density was 4.6 people per square mile (1.8/km^{2}). There were 61 housing units at an average density of 1.8/sq mi (0.7/km^{2}). The racial makeup of the township was 96.25% White, 2.50% African American, 1.25% from other races. Hispanic or Latino of any race were 3.75% of the population.

There were 57 households, out of which 33.3% had children under the age of 18 living with them, 68.4% were married couples living together, 5.3% had a female householder with no husband present, and 24.6% were non-families. 19.3% of all households were made up of individuals, and 5.3% had someone living alone who was 65 years of age or older. The average household size was 2.81 and the average family size was 3.30.

In the township the population was spread out, with 30.6% under the age of 18, 4.4% from 18 to 24, 24.4% from 25 to 44, 24.4% from 45 to 64, and 16.3% who were 65 years of age or older. The median age was 40 years. For every 100 females, there were 105.1 males. For every 100 females age 18 and over, there were 109.4 males.

The median income for a household in the township was $38,750, and the median income for a family was $42,656. Males had a median income of $31,875 versus $20,250 for females. The per capita income for the township was $13,293. None of the families and 2.4% of the population were living below the poverty line.
