= Grove Lake (Clay and Otter Tail counties, Minnesota) =

Lake in the state of Minnesota, United States

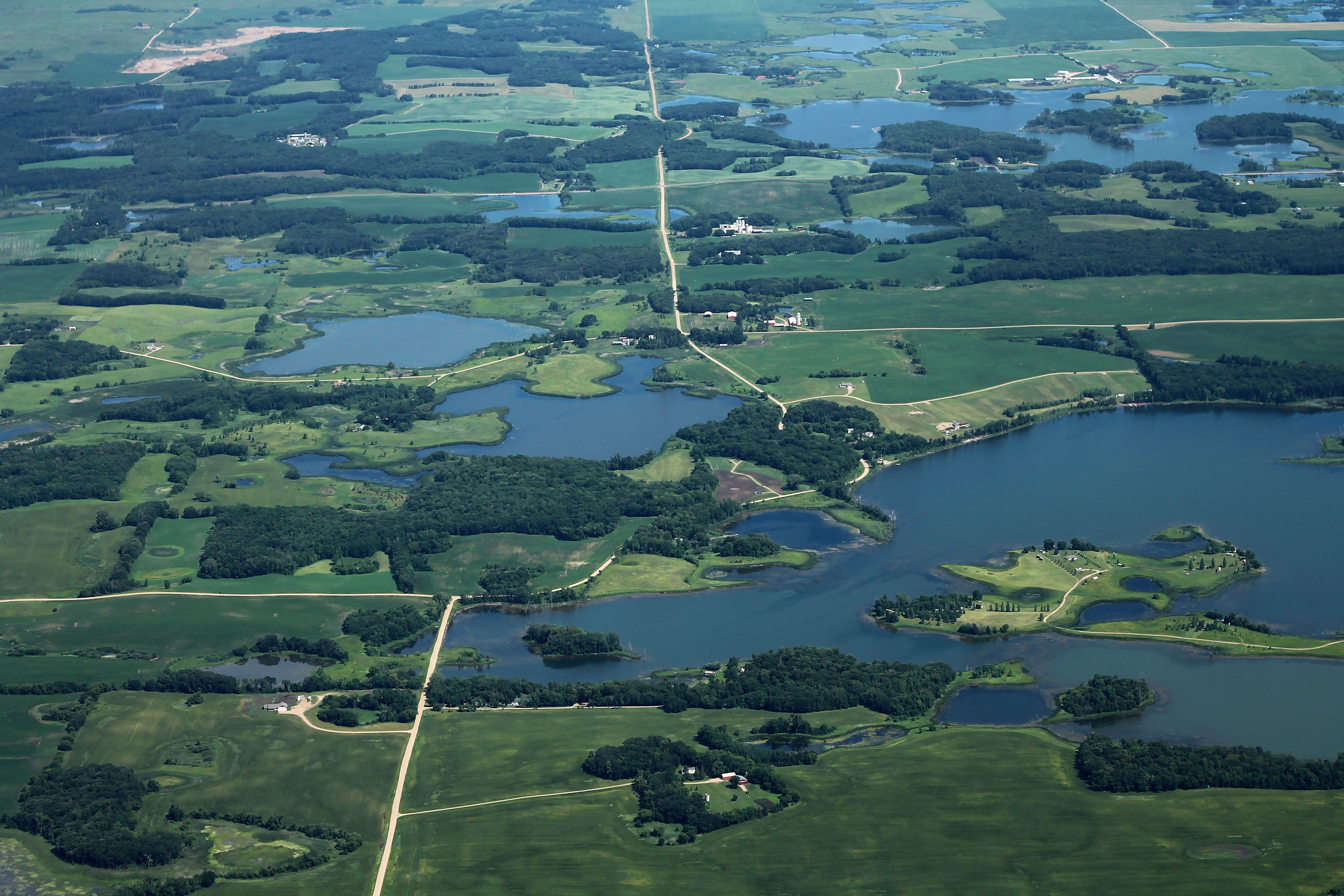
- Aerial view of the lake

- Location within Minnesota
- Location: Clay and Otter Tail counties, Minnesota
- Coordinates: 46°37′56″N 96°9′36″W
- Type: lake

Grove Lake is a lake in Clay and Otter Tail counties, in the U.S. state of Minnesota.

Grove Lake was named for the grove on the lake island within the lake.

== See also ==
- List of lakes in Minnesota
