= Barsness Lake =

Lake in the state of Minnesota, United States

- Location within Minnesota
- Location: Douglas County, Minnesota
- Coordinates: 45°54′35″N 95°39′10″W
- Type: lake

Barsness Lake is a lake in Douglas County, in the U.S. state of Minnesota.

== History ==
Barsness Lake was named for Albert and Oscar Barsness.

== See also ==
- List of lakes in Minnesota
