= Westport, Minnesota =

City in Minnesota, United States

- City
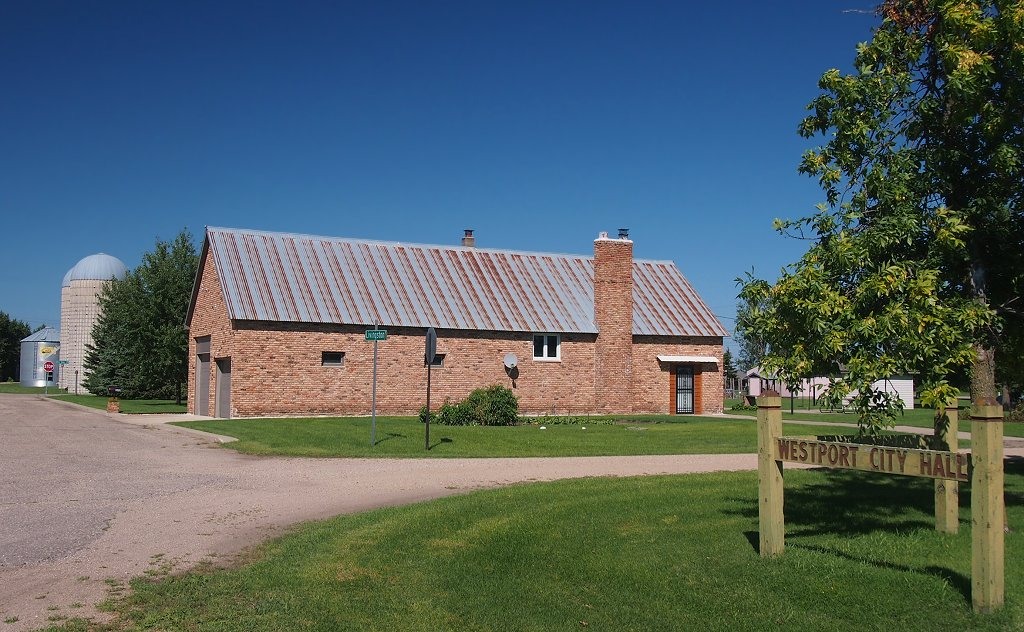
- Westport, Minnesota

- Location of Westport, Minnesota
- Coordinates: 45°42′52″N 95°10′05″W
- Country: United States
- State: Minnesota
- County: Pope
- Founded: 1866
- Incorporated: March 13, 1926

Government
  - Mayor: Tim Rechkemmer

Area
  - Total: 0.264 sq mi (0.683 km^{2})
  - Land: 0.264 sq mi (0.683 km^{2})
  - Water: 0 sq mi (0.000 km^{2})
- Elevation: 1,332 ft (406 m)

Population (2020)
  - Total: 44
  - Estimate (2022): 42
  - Density: 166.9/sq mi (64.45/km^{2})
- Time zone: UTC−6 (Central (CST))
  - Summer (DST): UTC−5 (CDT)
- ZIP Code: 56385
- Area code: 320
- FIPS code: 27-69628
- GNIS feature ID: 2397286
- Sales tax: 6.875%

Westport is a city in Pope County, Minnesota, United States. The population was 44 at the 2020 census.

== History ==
Westport was platted in 1882. A post office called Westport was established in 1888, and remained in operation until 1966.

== Geography ==
According to the United States Census Bureau, the city has a total area of 0.264 square miles (0.68 km^{2}), all land.

Minnesota State Highway 28 serves as a main route in the community.

== Demographics ==
Historical population
Census	Pop.	Note	%±
1930	81		—
1940	102		25.9%
1950	96		−5.9%
1960	87		−9.4%
1970	65		−25.3%
1980	50		−23.1%
1990	47		−6.0%
2000	72		53.2%
2010	57		−20.8%
2020	44		−22.8%
2022 (est.)	42		−4.5%
U.S. Decennial Census; 2020 Census

=== 2010 census ===
As of the 2010 census, there were 57 people, 22 households, and 13 families living in the city. The population density was 203.6 inhabitants per square mile (78.6/km^{2}). There were 23 housing units at an average density of 82.1 per square mile (31.7/km^{2}). The racial makeup of the city was 80.7% White, 3.5% African American, and 15.8% from other races. Hispanic or Latino of any race were 15.8% of the population.

There were 22 households, of which 36.4% had children under the age of 18 living with them, 50.0% were married couples living together, 4.5% had a female householder with no husband present, 4.5% had a male householder with no wife present, and 40.9% were non-families. 36.4% of all households were made up of individuals, and 9% had someone living alone who was 65 years of age or older. The average household size was 2.59 and the average family size was 3.31.

The median age in the city was 39.8 years. 29.8% of residents were under the age of 18; 0% were between the ages of 18 and 24; 31.6% were from 25 to 44; 31.6% were from 45 to 64; and 7% were 65 years of age or older. The gender makeup of the city was 54.4% male and 45.6% female.

=== 2000 census ===
As of the 2000 census, there were 72 people, 23 households, and 18 families living in the city. The population density was 257.4 inhabitants per square mile (99.4/km^{2}). There were 25 housing units at an average density of 89.4 per square mile (34.5/km^{2}). The racial makeup of the city was 100.00% White.

There were 23 households, out of which 47.8% had children under the age of 18 living with them, 60.9% were married couples living together, 4.3% had a female householder with no husband present, and 17.4% were non-families. 17.4% of all households were made up of individuals, and 8.7% had someone living alone who was 65 years of age or older. The average household size was 3.13 and the average family size was 3.21.

In the city, the population was spread out, with 31.9% under the age of 18, 15.3% from 18 to 24, 26.4% from 25 to 44, 13.9% from 45 to 64, and 12.5% who were 65 years of age or older. The median age was 29 years. For every 100 females, there were 80.0 males. For every 100 females age 18 and over, there were 81.5 males.

The median income for a household in the city was $38,438, and the median income for a family was $38,750. Males had a median income of $22,188 versus $19,688 for females. The per capita income for the city was $14,501. There were no families and 4.3% of the population living below the poverty line, including no under eighteens and 33.3% of those over 64.
