= Grove Lake (Pope County, Minnesota) =

Lake in the state of Minnesota, United States

- Location within Minnesota
- Location: Pope County, Minnesota
- Coordinates: 45°36′0″N 95°11′15″W
- Type: lake

Grove Lake is a lake in Pope County, in the U.S. state of Minnesota.

Grove Lake has an area of 345.46 acres with a shore length of 5.1 miles. The mean depth of the lake is 10.3 feet, with a maximum depth of 31 feet. Grove Lake has a high level of access, with 114 lakeshore owners, along with both a public boat and DNR access.

The Minnesota DNR gives Grove Lake a Lake Health Grade of C+.

Grove Lake was named for a grove of trees near the lake shore.

== See also ==
- List of lakes in Minnesota
