= Langhei Township, Pope County, Minnesota =

Langhei Township, Minnesota
- Township
- Location within the state of Minnesota Langhei Township, Minnesota (the United States)
- Coordinates: 45°27′38″N 95°34′20″W
- Country: United States
- State: Minnesota
- County: Pope

Area
  - Total: 35.9 sq mi (93.0 km^{2})
  - Land: 35.3 sq mi (91.5 km^{2})
  - Water: 0.58 sq mi (1.5 km^{2})
- Elevation: 1,204 ft (367 m)

Population (2000)
  - Total: 217
  - Density: 6.2/sq mi (2.4/km^{2})
- Time zone: UTC-6 (Central (CST))
  - Summer (DST): UTC-5 (CDT)
- FIPS code: 27-35504
- GNIS feature ID: 0664723

Langhei Township is a township in Pope County, Minnesota, United States. Langhei is a name derived from Norwegian meaning "long highland". The population was 171 at the 2020 census.

== Geography ==
According to the United States Census Bureau, the township has a total area of 35.9 square miles (93 km^{2}), of which 35.3 square miles (91 km^{2}) is land and 0.6 square miles (1.6 km^{2}) (1.61%) is water.

== Demographics ==
As of the census of 2000, there were 217 people, 78 households, and 63 families residing in the township. The population density was 6.1 inhabitants per square mile (2.4/km^{2}). There were 99 housing units at an average density of 2.8 per square mile (1.1/km^{2}). The racial makeup of the township was 100.00% White.

There were 78 households, out of which 32.1% had children under the age of 18 living with them, 74.4% were married couples living together, 1.3% had a female householder with no husband present, and 19.2% were non-families. 17.9% of all households were made up of individuals, and 6.4% had someone living alone who was 65 years of age or older. The average household size was 2.78 and the average family size was 3.17.

In the township the population was spread out, with 30.4% under the age of 18, 5.5% from 18 to 24, 22.6% from 25 to 44, 23.0% from 45 to 64, and 18.4% who were 65 years of age or older. The median age was 40 years. For every 100 females, there were 119.2 males. For every 100 females age 18 and over, there were 125.4 males.

The median income for a household in the township was $43,929, and the median income for a family was $49,063. Males had a median income of $38,542 versus $16,250 for females. The per capita income for the township was $16,829. None of the population or families were below the poverty line.
