= Cyrus, Minnesota =

City in Minnesota, US

Cyrus
- City
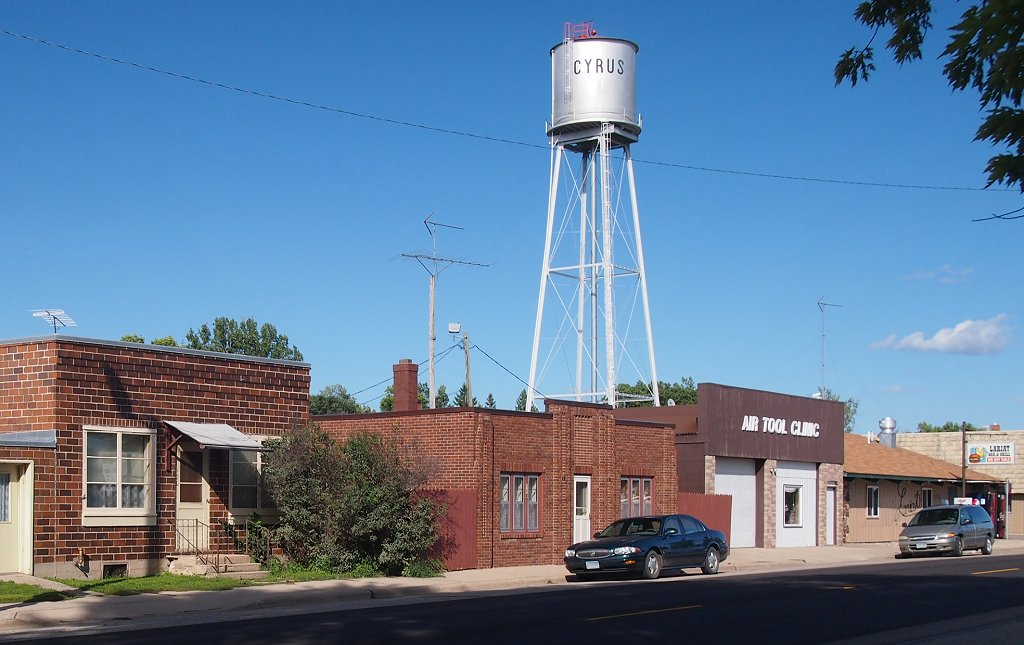
- Cyrus, Minnesota

- Location of Cyrus, Minnesota
- Coordinates: 45°36′53″N 95°44′18″W
- Country: United States
- State: Minnesota
- County: Pope
- Founded: 1882

Area
  - Total: 0.27 sq mi (0.69 km^{2})
  - Land: 0.27 sq mi (0.69 km^{2})
  - Water: 0 sq mi (0.00 km^{2})
- Elevation: 1,158 ft (353 m)

Population (2020)
  - Total: 305
  - Estimate (2021): 312
  - Density: 1,146.6/sq mi (442.72/km^{2})
- Time zone: UTC-6 (Central)
  - Summer (DST): UTC-5 (CDT)
- ZIP code: 56323
- Area code: 320
- FIPS code: 27-14446
- GNIS feature ID: 2393704
- Website: cityofcyrus.com

Cyrus is a city in Pope County, Minnesota, United States, along the Chippewa River. The population was 305 at the 2020 census.

== History ==
Cyrus was platted in 1882, and a post office has been in operation at Cyrus since that year.

== Geography ==
According to the United States Census Bureau, the city has a total area of 0.28 square miles (0.73 km^{2}), all land.

Minnesota State Highway 28 serves as a main route in the community.

== Demographics ==
Historical population
Census	Pop.	Note	%±
1900	197		—
1910	272		38.1%
1920	312		14.7%
1930	386		23.7%
1940	357		−7.5%
1950	363		1.7%
1960	362		−0.3%
1970	289		−20.2%
1980	334		15.6%
1990	328		−1.8%
2000	303		−7.6%
2010	288		−5.0%
2020	305		5.9%
2021 (est.)	312		2.3%
U.S. Decennial Census; 2020 Census

=== 2010 census ===
As of the census of 2010, there were 288 people, 137 households, and 74 families residing in the city. The population density was 1,028.6 inhabitants per square mile (397.1/km^{2}). There were 157 housing units at an average density of 560.7 per square mile (216.5/km^{2}). The racial makeup of the city was 95.8% White, 0.7% African American, 0.3% Native American, and 3.1% from two or more races.

There were 137 households, of which 21.9% had children under the age of 18 living with them, 39.4% were married couples living together, 10.2% had a female householder with no husband present, 4.4% had a male householder with no wife present, and 46.0% were non-families. 37.2% of all households were made up of individuals, and 14.5% had someone living alone who was 65 years of age or older. The average household size was 2.10 and the average family size was 2.70.

The median age in the city was 39.3 years. 23.3% of residents were under the age of 18; 4.8% were between the ages of 18 and 24; 29.4% were from 25 to 44; 22.6% were from 45 to 64; and 19.8% were 65 years of age or older. The gender makeup of the city was 47.2% male and 52.8% female.

=== 2000 census ===
As of the census of 2000, there were 303 people, 150 households, and 82 families residing in the city. The population density was 1,050.6 inhabitants per square mile (405.6/km^{2}). There were 164 housing units at an average density of 568.6 per square mile (219.5/km^{2}). The racial makeup of the city was 97.69% White, 0.33% Native American, 0.99% Asian, and 0.99% from two or more races.

There were 150 households, out of which 22.7% had children under the age of 18 living with them, 42.7% were married couples living together, 9.3% had a female householder with no husband present, and 45.3% were non-families. 42.0% of all households were made up of individuals, and 22.7% had someone living alone who was 65 years of age or older. The average household size was 2.02 and the average family size was 2.72.

In the city, the population was spread out, with 18.5% under the age of 18, 11.2% from 18 to 24, 23.4% from 25 to 44, 22.1% from 45 to 64, and 24.8% who were 65 years of age or older. The median age was 42 years. For every 100 females, there were 80.4 males. For every 100 females age 18 and over, there were 79.0 males.

The median income for a household in the city was $26,875, and the median income for a family was $40,500. Males had a median income of $32,000 versus $21,250 for females. The per capita income for the city was $19,836. About 4.8% of families and 12.6% of the population were below the poverty line, including 21.1% of those under the age of eighteen and 10.3% of those 65 or over.
