= SS Minnewaska =

SS Minnewaska may refer to:

- SS Minnewaska (1894), an ocean liner built as Persia for Hamburg America Line, bought by Atlantic Transport Line in 1897 and renamed Minnewaska. Requisitioned by the US Government in the Spanish–American War, then bought and renamed USAT Thomas. She was scrapped in July 1928.
- SS Minnewaska (1908), an ocean liner built for the Atlantic Transport Line, converted into a troopship, mined in 1916, beached but was a total loss.
- SS Minnewaska (1923), an ocean liner for the Atlantic Transport Line and the Red Star Line. She was scrapped in 1933.
