= New Prairie Township, Pope County, Minnesota =

New Prairie Township, Minnesota
- Township
- Location within the state of Minnesota New Prairie Township, Minnesota (the United States)
- Coordinates: 45°38′10″N 95°41′11″W
- Country: United States
- State: Minnesota
- County: Pope

Area
  - Total: 35.8 sq mi (92.8 km^{2})
  - Land: 35.2 sq mi (91.1 km^{2})
  - Water: 0.66 sq mi (1.7 km^{2})
- Elevation: 1,201 ft (366 m)

Population (2020)
  - Total: 295
  - Density: 7.3/sq mi (2.8/km^{2})
- Time zone: UTC-6 (Central (CST))
  - Summer (DST): UTC-5 (CDT)
- FIPS code: 27-45844
- GNIS feature ID: 0665108

New Prairie Township is a township in Pope County, Minnesota, United States. The population was 295 at the 2020 census.

New Prairie Township was so named by pioneers who settled upon the prairie.

== Geography ==
According to the United States Census Bureau, the township has a total area of 35.8 square miles (92.8 km^{2}), of which 35.2 square miles (91.1 km^{2}) is land and 0.7 square mile (1.7 km^{2}) (1.87%) is water.

== Demographics ==
As of the census of 2000, there were 252 people, 84 households, and 71 families residing in the township. The population density was 7.2 people per square mile (2.8/km^{2}). There were 87 housing units at an average density of 2.5/sq mi (1.0/km^{2}). The racial makeup of the township was 97.22% White, 1.19% African American, 1.19% from other races, and 0.40% from two or more races.

There were 84 households, out of which 40.5% had children under the age of 18 living with them, 75.0% were married couples living together, 7.1% had a female householder with no husband present, and 14.3% were non-families. 10.7% of all households were made up of individuals, and 7.1% had someone living alone who was 65 years of age or older. The average household size was 3.00 and the average family size was 3.24.

In the township the population was spread out, with 30.6% under the age of 18, 6.7% from 18 to 24, 23.4% from 25 to 44, 24.2% from 45 to 64, and 15.1% who were 65 years of age or older. The median age was 37 years. For every 100 females, there were 108.3 males. For every 100 females age 18 and over, there were 98.9 males.

The median income for a household in the township was $41,875, and the median income for a family was $43,333. Males had a median income of $33,750 versus $20,469 for females. The per capita income for the township was $17,136. About 7.3% of families and 8.4% of the population were below the poverty line, including 7.4% of those under the age of eighteen and 3.9% of those 65 or over.
