= Grove Lake, Minnesota =

Grove Lake
- Unincorporated community
- Location within Minnesota Location within the United States
- Coordinates: 45°36′51″N 95°09′27″W
- Country: United States
- State: Minnesota
- County: Pope
- Elevation: 1,348 ft (411 m)
- Time zone: UTC-6 (Central (CST))
  - Summer (DST): UTC-5 (CDT)
- Area code: 320
- GNIS feature ID: 644503

Grove Lake is an unincorporated community in Pope County, Minnesota, United States.
