= La Grand Township, Douglas County, Minnesota =

La Grand Township, Minnesota
- Township
- Location within the state of Minnesota La Grand Township, Minnesota (the United States)
- Coordinates: 45°53′38″N 95°26′21″W
- Country: United States
- State: Minnesota
- County: Douglas

Area
  - Total: 32.9 sq mi (85.2 km^{2})
  - Land: 26.4 sq mi (68.4 km^{2})
  - Water: 6.5 sq mi (16.9 km^{2})
- Elevation: 1,421 ft (433 m)

Population (2000)
  - Total: 4,056
  - Density: 154/sq mi (59.3/km^{2})
- Time zone: UTC-6 (Central (CST))
  - Summer (DST): UTC-5 (CDT)
- FIPS code: 27-33992
- GNIS feature ID: 0664657

La Grand Township is a township in Douglas County, Minnesota, United States. The population was 4,279 at the 2020 census.

La Grand Township was organized in 1873, and named after an early settler.

== Geography ==
According to the United States Census Bureau, the township has a total area of 32.9 square miles (85 km^{2}), of which 26.4 square miles (68 km^{2}) is land and 6.5 square miles (17 km^{2}) (19.78%) is water.

== Demographics ==
As of the census of 2000, there were 4,056 people, 1,528 households, and 1,231 families residing in the township. The population density was 153.6 inhabitants per square mile (59.3/km^{2}). There were 1,813 housing units at an average density of 68.7 per square mile (26.5/km^{2}). The racial makeup of the township was 99.21% White, 0.07% African American, 0.07% Native American, 0.39% Asian, 0.02% from other races, and 0.22% from two or more races. Hispanic or Latino of any race were 0.20% of the population.

There were 1,528 households, out of which 33.8% had children under the age of 18 living with them, 74.0% were married couples living together, 4.5% had a female householder with no husband present, and 19.4% were non-families. 15.4% of all households were made up of individuals, and 7.5% had someone living alone who was 65 years of age or older. The average household size was 2.65 and the average family size was 2.95.

In the township the population was spread out, with 25.1% under the age of 18, 7.5% from 18 to 24, 24.7% from 25 to 44, 27.5% from 45 to 64, and 15.2% who were 65 years of age or older. The median age was 40 years. For every 100 females, there were 102.6 males. For every 100 females age 18 and over, there were 103.2 males.

The median income for a household in the township was $52,500, and the median income for a family was $56,303. Males had a median income of $36,723 versus $24,213 for females. The per capita income for the township was $20,837. About 3.6% of families and 4.4% of the population were below the poverty line, including 6.6% of those under age 18 and 1.3% of those age 65 or over.
