= Lake Minnewaska (Minnesota) =

Lake in the state of Minnesota, United States

- Location within Minnesota
- Location: Pope County, Minnesota
- Coordinates: 45°36′42″N 95°26′47″W
- Type: lake

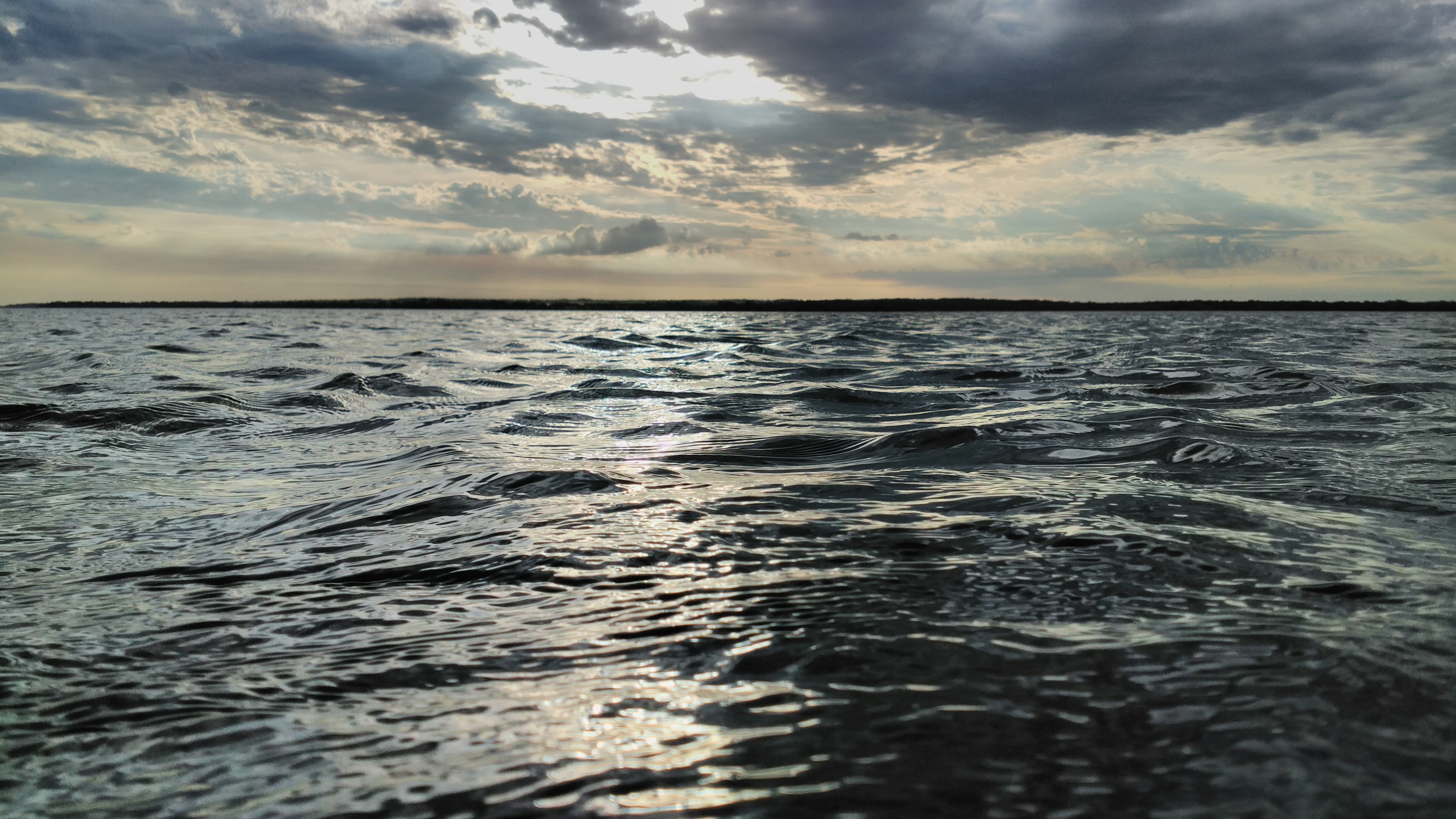
Lake Minnewaska

Lake Minnewaska is a lake in Pope County, in the U.S. state of Minnesota. It is approximately 8,050 sq acres (33 km^{2}) in size with 20 miles (32 km) of shoreline. The lake has a maximum depth of 32 feet (10 m) and an average depth of 17 feet (5 m). The cities of Glenwood and Starbuck are located along the lake.

The lake is home to a variety of fish species, including walleye, northern pike, bass, and sunfish. It is part of the watershed of the Minnesota River via Outlet Creek, Lake Emily, and an unnamed channel that flows from Lake Emily to the Chippewa River.

The name Minnewaska comes from a phrase meaning "good water" in the Dakota language, derived from the words "mni" meaning water and "wašté" meaning good.. Dakota speakers also historically referred to this lake as "Bde Škokpa", or the "Hollow Lake", due to steep surrounding hills, particularly on the northeast side.

== See also ==
- List of lakes in Minnesota
