= Barsness Township, Pope County, Minnesota =

Barsness Township, Minnesota
- Township
- Location within the state of Minnesota Barsness Township, Minnesota (the United States)
- Coordinates: 45°32′45″N 95°25′44″W
- Country: United States
- State: Minnesota
- County: Pope

Area
  - Total: 35.3 sq mi (91.4 km^{2})
  - Land: 33.1 sq mi (85.7 km^{2})
  - Water: 2.2 sq mi (5.7 km^{2})
- Elevation: 1,227 ft (374 m)

Population (2000)
  - Total: 138
  - Density: 4.1/sq mi (1.6/km^{2})
- Time zone: UTC-6 (Central (CST))
  - Summer (DST): UTC-5 (CDT)
- FIPS code: 27-03754
- GNIS feature ID: 0663514

Barsness Township is a township in Pope County, Minnesota, United States. The population was 137 at the 2020 census.

== History ==
Barsness Township was named for brothers Erik N. Barsness, Nels N. Barsness, and Ole N. Barsness, Norwegian settlers. Nels Barsness's daughter, physician Nellie Barsness, was born on the family's homestead there.

The township was originally surveyed in 1857. The first settler was Olaus Olson Grove.

== Geography ==
According to the United States Census Bureau, the township has a total area of 35.3 square miles (91 km^{2}), of which 33.1 square miles (86 km^{2}) is land and 2.2 square miles (5.7 km^{2}) (6.21%) is water.

== Demographics ==
As of the census of 2000, there were 138 people, 50 households, and 39 families residing in the township. The population density was 4.2 inhabitants per square mile (1.6/km^{2}). There were 60 housing units at an average density of 1.8 per square mile (0.69/km^{2}). The racial makeup of the township was 99.28% White and 0.72% Native American.

There were 50 households, out of which 38.0% had children under the age of 18 living with them, 74.0% were married couples living together, 2.0% had a female householder with no husband present, and 22.0% were non-families. 20.0% of all households were made up of individuals, and 8.0% had someone living alone who was 65 years of age or older. The average household size was 2.76 and the average family size was 3.21.

In the township the population was spread out, with 28.3% under the age of 18, 6.5% from 18 to 24, 27.5% from 25 to 44, 27.5% from 45 to 64, and 10.1% who were 65 years of age or older. The median age was 39 years. For every 100 females, there were 119.0 males. For every 100 females age 18 and over, there were 102.0 males.

The median income for a household in the township was $33,125, and the median income for a family was $40,000. Males had a median income of $28,333 versus $26,250 for females. The per capita income for the township was $19,867. There were 5.6% of families and 5.1% of the population living below the poverty line, including no under eighteens and 28.6% of those over 64.
