= Ben Wade Township, Pope County, Minnesota =

Ben Wade Township, Minnesota
- Township
- Location within the state of Minnesota Ben Wade Township, Minnesota (the United States)
- Coordinates: 45°42′22″N 95°34′47″W
- Country: United States
- State: Minnesota
- County: Pope

Area
  - Total: 35.4 sq mi (91.7 km^{2})
  - Land: 34.0 sq mi (88.1 km^{2})
  - Water: 1.4 sq mi (3.6 km^{2})
- Elevation: 1,300 ft (400 m)

Population (2000)
  - Total: 252
  - Density: 7.5/sq mi (2.9/km^{2})
- Time zone: UTC-6 (Central (CST))
  - Summer (DST): UTC-5 (CDT)
- FIPS code: 27-05302
- GNIS feature ID: 0663573

Ben Wade Township is a township in Pope County, Minnesota, United States. The population was 262 at the 2020 census.

Ben Wade Township was named for Benjamin Wade (1800–1878), an American lawyer and United States senator from Ohio.

== Geography ==
According to the United States Census Bureau, the township has a total area of 35.4 mi^{2} (91.7 km^{2}), of which 34.0 mi^{2} (88.1 km^{2}) is land and 1.4 mi^{2} (3.6 km^{2}) (3.95%) is water.

== Demographics ==
As of the census of 2000, there were 252 people, 88 households, and 68 families residing in the township. The population density was 7.4/mi^{2} (2.9/km^{2}). There were 95 housing units at an average density of 2.8/mi^{2} (1.1/km^{2}). The racial makeup of the township was 98.81% White, 0.40% African American, 0.40% Native American, and 0.40% from two or more races.

There were 88 households, out of which 38.6% had children under the age of 18 living with them, 72.7% were married couples living together, and 22.7% were non-families. 21.6% of all households were made up of individuals, and 8.0% had someone living alone who was 65 years of age or older. The average household size was 2.86 and the average family size was 3.37.

In the township the population was spread out, with 30.6% under the age of 18, 7.9% from 18 to 24, 30.2% from 25 to 44, 21.4% from 45 to 64, and 9.9% who were 65 years of age or older. The median age was 34 years. For every 100 females, there were 115.4 males. For every 100 females age 18 and over, there were 124.4 males.

The median income for a household in the township was $36,458, and the median income for a family was $45,278. Males had a median income of $30,469 versus $18,750 for females. The per capita income for the township was $14,500. About 9.5% of families and 12.5% of the population were below the poverty line, including 14.8% of those under the age of eighteen and none of those 65 or over.
