= Warren Upham =

American geologist (1850–1934)

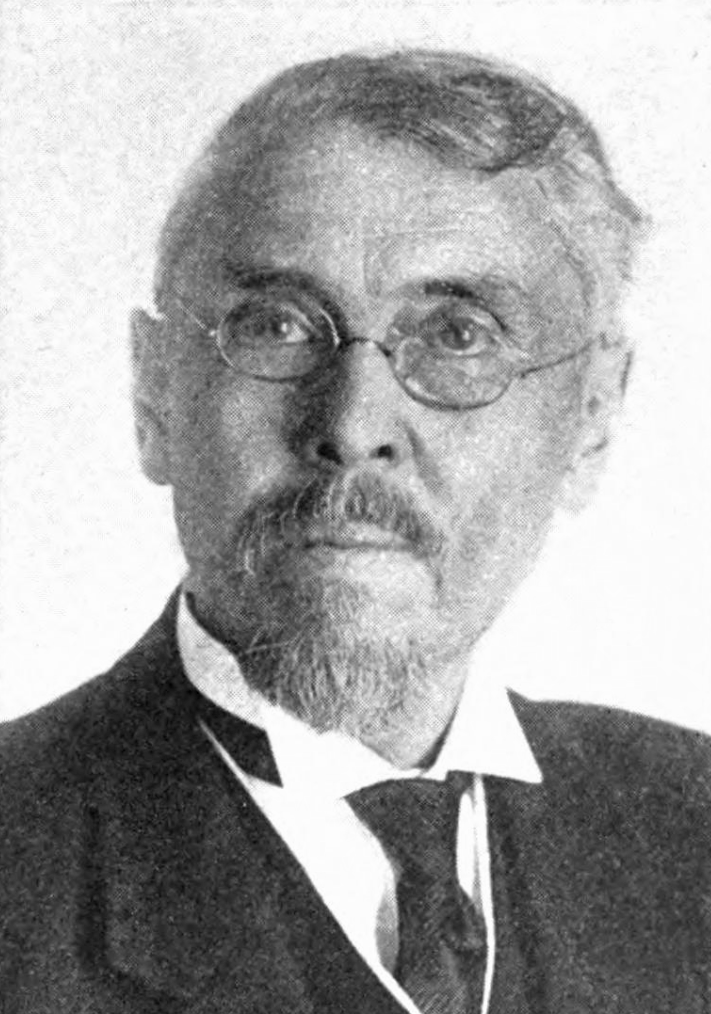
- Born: March 8, 1850; Amherst, New Hampshire
- Died: January 29, 1934 (aged 83); Saint Paul, Minnesota
- Education: Dartmouth College
- Occupations: Geologist, archaeologist, librarian
- Spouse: Addie M. Bixby (m. 1885)
- Children: 1

Warren Upham (March 8, 1850 – January 29, 1934) was an American geologist, archaeologist, and librarian who is best known for his studies of glacial Lake Agassiz.

== Biography ==
Warren Upham was born in Amherst, New Hampshire and attended Dartmouth College. He married Addie M. Bixby in 1885 and they had a daughter.

Upham worked as a geologist in New Hampshire before moving in 1879 to Minnesota to study the resources and glacial geology of that state.

He worked for the U.S. Geological Survey from 1885 to 1895. Upham's first major report on Lake Agassiz was published in 1890 by the Geological Survey of Canada, but the main product of his many years of study ("The Glacial Lake Agassiz") was published in 1895 as Monograph 25 of the U.S. Geological Survey's monograph series.

Upham graduated from Dartmouth College in 1871 and worked under Minnesota state geologist Newton H. Winchell. The Minnesota Historical Society published his landmark 735-page volume on place name origins, Minnesota Geographic Names: Their Origin and Historic Significance in 1920. A revised and enlarged third edition was published by the Minnesota Historical Society in 2001.

He was a member of the Geological Society of America, the Boston Society of Natural History, and the Archaeological Society of America.

Warren Upham died in Saint Paul, Minnesota on January 29, 1934.

== See also ==
- William H. Keating
