= Chippewa River (Minnesota) =

River in Minnesota, United States

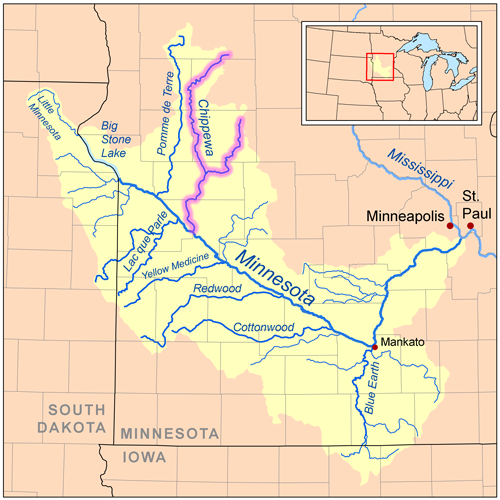
- Map of the Minnesota River watershed with the Chippewa River highlighted (including its East Branch)

- Mouth of the Chippewa River

Location
- Country: United States
- State: Minnesota
- Counties: Chippewa, Swift, Pope, Stevens, Grant, Douglas counties

Physical characteristics
- Source
  - location: Stowe Lake, Douglas County
  - coordinates: 45.9880164°N 95.6456011°W
- Mouth: Minnesota River
  - coordinates: 44.9346792°N 95.7333596°W
- Length: 153-mile-long (246 km)

Basin features
- River system: Minnesota River

The Chippewa River (Lakota: Mayáwakȟáŋ) is a 153-mile-long (246 km) tributary of the Minnesota River in western and southwestern Minnesota in the United States. Via the Minnesota River, it is part of the watershed of the Mississippi River.

The river was named after the Ojibwe (Chippewa) people.

== Course ==
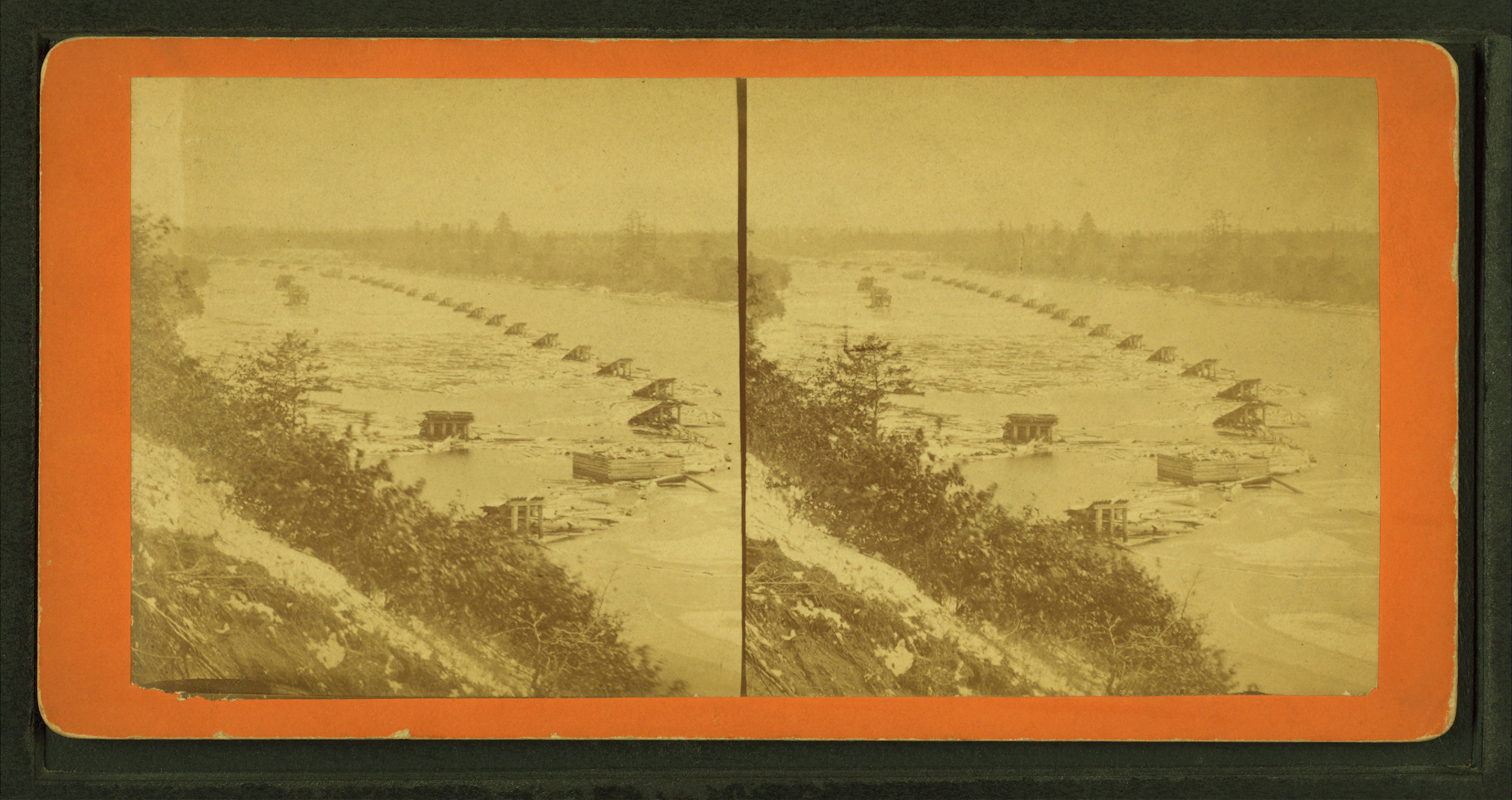
Stereoscopic photo of the Chippewa River by Benjamin Franklin Upton

The Chippewa River issues from Stowe Lake in Douglas County, 3 miles (5 km) northwest of Brandon, at the west end of a series of lakes that extends northward to lakes Aaron and Moses and eastward to Chippewa Lake. The Chippewa River passes through several more lakes in its upper course. It initially flows westwardly into Grant County, where it turns generally southward for the remainder of its course through Pope, Stevens, Swift and Chippewa counties. The river passes the towns of Hoffman, Cyrus and Benson; it joins the Minnesota River in Montevideo. Some sections of the river, especially along its middle course in Pope and Swift Counties, have been straightened and channelized.

In Pope County, the river collects the Little Chippewa River, 41 miles (66 km) long, which flows generally southwestwardly through Douglas and Pope counties. At Benson it collects the East Branch Chippewa River, about 64 miles (103 km) long, which rises in southeastern Douglas County and flows initially southward through Pope County, passing through several lakes, into Swift County, where it turns westward.

At Watson, Minnesota, the river has an average flow of 236 cubic feet per second.

== See also ==
- List of rivers of Minnesota
- List of longest streams of Minnesota
- List of Minnesota placenames of Native American origin
