= Glenwood, Minnesota =

City in Minnesota, United States

Glenwood
- City
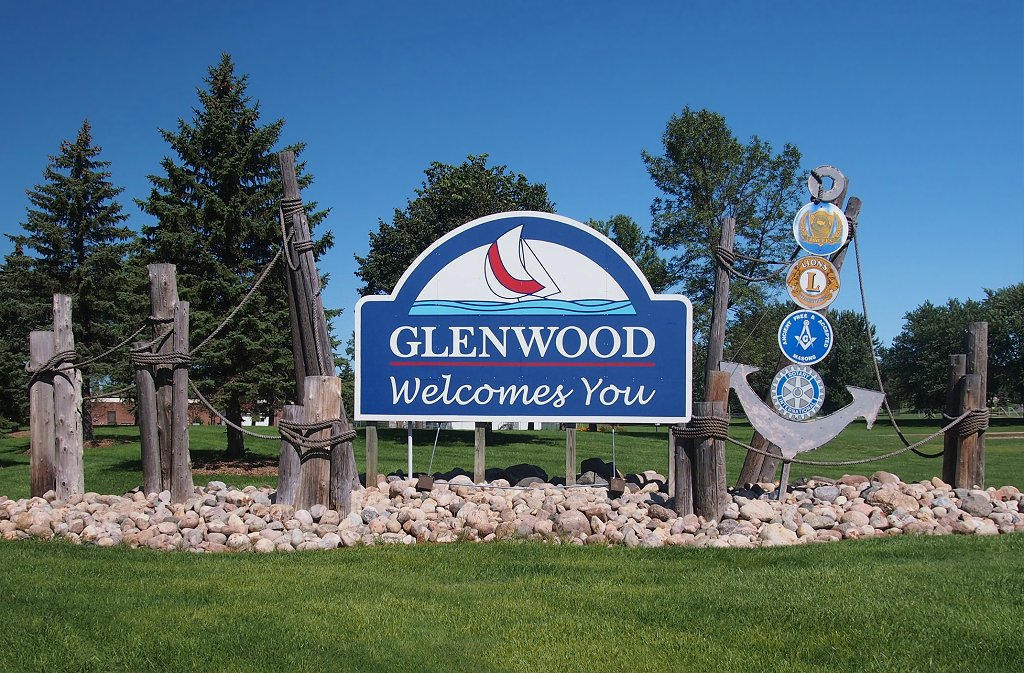
- Glenwood welcome sign

- Location of Glenwood within Pope County, Minnesota
- Coordinates: 45°39′24″N 95°23′19″W
- Country: United States
- State: Minnesota
- County: Pope
- Founded: 1866
- Incorporated: 1912

Government
  - Mayor: Sherri Kazda

Area
  - Total: 5.83 sq mi (15.11 km^{2})
  - Land: 5.69 sq mi (14.73 km^{2})
  - Water: 0.15 sq mi (0.39 km^{2})
- Elevation: 1,388 ft (423 m)

Population (2020)
  - Total: 2,657
  - Estimate (2022): 2,651
  - Density: 467.3/sq mi (180.41/km^{2})
- Time zone: UTC−6 (Central (CST))
  - Summer (DST): UTC−5 (CDT)
- ZIP code: 56334
- Area code: 320
- FIPS code: 27-24074
- GNIS feature ID: 2394915
- Website: ci.glenwood.mn.us

Glenwood is a city in, and the county seat of, Pope County, Minnesota, United States. The population was 2,657 at the 2020 census. It is located on the northeastern shore of Lake Minnewaska.

== History ==
Glenwood was platted in 1866, and named for the glen and woods near the original town site. A post office called Glenwood has been in operation since 1867. The city was incorporated in 1912.

== Geography ==
According to the United States Census Bureau, the city has a total area of 5.86 square miles (15.18 km^{2}), all land.

Glenwood is located at the east end of Lake Minnewaska at the junction of Minnesota State Highways 28, 29, 55, and 104. Lake Minnewaska is a large lake that brings in many people in the summer.

== Demographics ==
Historical population
| Census | Pop. | Note | %± |
|---|---|---|---|
| 1890 | 627 | | — |
| 1900 | 1,116 | | 78.0% |
| 1910 | 2,161 | | 93.6% |
| 1920 | 2,187 | | 1.2% |
| 1930 | 2,220 | | 1.5% |
| 1940 | 2,564 | | 15.5% |
| 1950 | 2,666 | | 4.0% |
| 1960 | 2,631 | | −1.3% |
| 1970 | 2,584 | | −1.8% |
| 1980 | 2,523 | | −2.4% |
| 1990 | 2,573 | | 2.0% |
| 2000 | 2,594 | | 0.8% |
| 2010 | 2,564 | | −1.2% |
| 2020 | 2,657 | | 3.6% |
| 2022 (est.) | 2,651 | | −0.2% |
U.S. Decennial Census; 2020 Census

=== 2020 census ===
As of the 2020 census, Glenwood had a population of 2,657. The median age was 43.6 years. 22.1% of residents were under the age of 18 and 25.4% of residents were 65 years of age or older. For every 100 females there were 88.0 males, and for every 100 females age 18 and over there were 81.9 males age 18 and over.

94.0% of residents lived in urban areas, while 6.0% lived in rural areas.

There were 1,247 households in Glenwood, of which 23.4% had children under the age of 18 living in them. Of all households, 38.8% were married-couple households, 19.5% were households with a male householder and no spouse or partner present, and 36.1% were households with a female householder and no spouse or partner present. About 42.7% of all households were made up of individuals and 21.9% had someone living alone who was 65 years of age or older.

There were 1,406 housing units, of which 11.3% were vacant. The homeowner vacancy rate was 2.1% and the rental vacancy rate was 10.2%.

Racial composition as of the 2020 census
| Race | Number | Percent |
|---|---|---|
| White | 2,472 | 93.0% |
| Black or African American | 13 | 0.5% |
| American Indian and Alaska Native | 12 | 0.5% |
| Asian | 18 | 0.7% |
| Native Hawaiian and Other Pacific Islander | 0 | 0.0% |
| Some other race | 21 | 0.8% |
| Two or more races | 121 | 4.6% |
| Hispanic or Latino (of any race) | 76 | 2.9% |

=== 2010 census ===
As of the census of 2010, there were 2,564 people, 1,185 households, and 656 families living in the city. The population density was 437.5 inhabitants per square mile (168.9/km^{2}). There were 1,339 housing units at an average density of 228.5 units per square mile (88.2 units/km^{2}). The racial makeup of the city was 97.2% White, 0.8% African American, 0.3% Native American, 0.4% Asian, 0.1% from other races, and 1.3% from two or more races. Hispanic or Latino of any race were 1.3% of the population.

There were 1,185 households, of which 24.6% had children under the age of 18 living with them, 42.2% were married couples living together, 10.4% had a female householder with no husband present, 2.8% had a male householder with no wife present, and 44.6% were non-families. 40.4% of all households were made up of individuals, and 21.7% had someone living alone who was 65 years of age or older. The average household size was 2.08 and the average family size was 2.79.

The median age in the city was 44.1 years. 21.3% of residents were under the age of 18; 7.2% were between the ages of 18 and 24; 22.5% were from 25 to 44; 23.9% were from 45 to 64; and 25.2% were 65 years of age or older. The gender makeup of the city was 45.7% male and 54.3% female.

=== 2000 census ===
As of the census of 2000, there were 2,594 people, 1,131 households, and 629 families living in the city. The population density was 179.8 people/km^{2} (466 people/mi^{2}). There were 1,202 housing units at an average density of 83.3 inhabitants per square kilometre (216 inhabitants/mi^{2}). The racial makeup of the city was 98.92% White, 0.15% African American, 0.23% Native American, 0.00% Asian, 0.04% Pacific Islander, 0.31% from other races, and 0.35% from two or more races. 0.58% of the population were Hispanic or Latino of any race.

There were 1,131 households, out of which 24.7% had children under the age of 18 living with them, 44.2% were married couples living together, 9.1% had a woman whose husband does not live with her, and 44.3% were non-families. 40.0% of all households were made up of individuals, and 24.4% had someone living alone who was 65 years of age or older. The average household size was 2.11 and the average family size was 2.83.

In the city, the population was spread out, with 20.9% under the age of 18, 7.6% from 18 to 24, 21.7% from 25 to 44, 18.8% from 45 to 64, and 31.0% who were 65 years of age or older. The median age was 45 years. For every 100 females, there were 81.5 males. For every 100 females age 18 and over, there were 72.2 males.

The median income for a household in the city was $30,083, and the median income for a family was $41,486. Males had a median income of $30,000 versus $21,652 for females. The per capita income for the city was $21,758. 7.9% of the population and 3.6% of families were below the poverty line. Out of the total people living in poverty, 8.6% were under the age of 18 and 11.8% were 65 or older.

== Education ==
Glenwood is served by the Minnewaska School District, which provides education for students from preschool through 12th grade. The district operates multiple schools, including Minnewaska Area Elementary School, Minnewaska Area Intermediate School, and Minnewaska Area High School. As of 2022, the district served 1,345 students, and had a student to teacher ratio of 13.90.

Athletics and activities play a significant role in student life, with Minnewaska schools participating in the Minnesota State High School League (MSHSL). Students have access to various sports teams, music programs, theater productions, and clubs. The district emphasizes community involvement, partnering with local organizations and businesses to enhance educational opportunities.

== Notable people ==
- John Englund, Wisconsin State Senator and newspaper editor
- Earl Hauge, Minnesota State Representative and Lutheran minister
- Loziene J. Lee, Minnesota State Representative and labor activist
- Cindy Rarick, golfer; winner of five LPGA Tour events
- Ernest O. Wollan, physicist
