= Pope County, Minnesota =

County in Minnesota, United States

- County
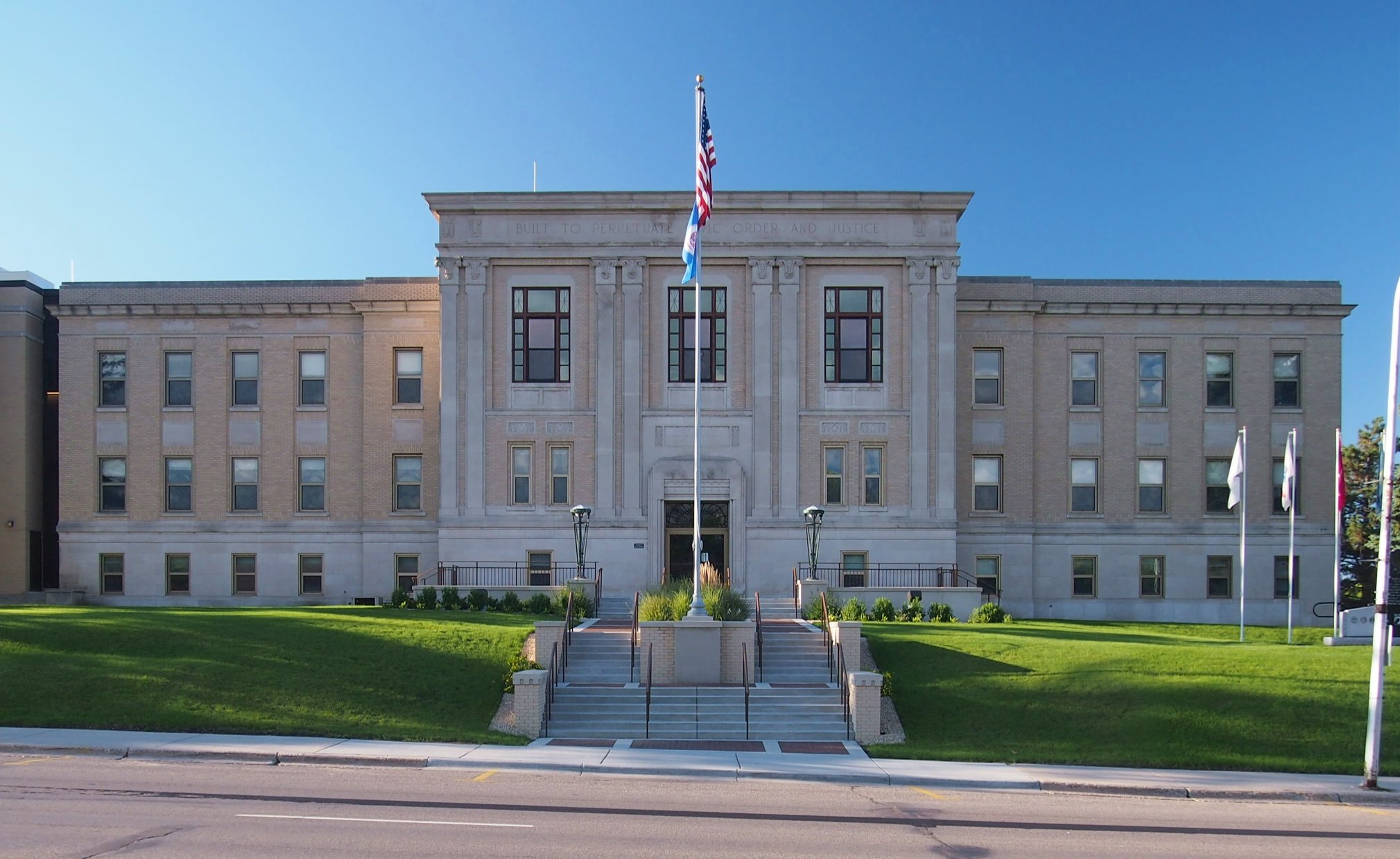
- The 1930 Beaux-Arts, Pope County Courthouse is listed on the National Register of Historic Places.

- Location within the U.S. state of Minnesota
- Coordinates: 45°35′N 95°27′W
- Country: United States
- State: Minnesota
- Created: 1862
- Organized: 1866
- Named for: John Pope
- Seat: Glenwood
- Largest city: Glenwood

Area
  - Total: 717 sq mi (1,860 km^{2})
  - Land: 670 sq mi (1,700 km^{2})
  - Water: 47 sq mi (120 km^{2}) 6.6%

Population (2020)
  - Total: 11,308
  - Estimate (2025): 11,420 ▲
  - Density: 16.9/sq mi (6.5/km^{2})
- Time zone: UTC−6 (Central)
  - Summer (DST): UTC−5 (CDT)
- Congressional district: 7th
- Website: www.popecountymn.gov

Pope County is a county in the U.S. state of Minnesota. As of the 2020 census, the population was 11,308. Its county seat is Glenwood. The county was formed in 1862 and organized in 1866.

== History ==
Pope County was identified by the state legislature in 1862 and named for John Pope, a Union Army general who had worked as a surveyor in the area. Its organization was effected in 1866.

Until May 1965, when county option was eliminated, Pope County was a dry county; no beverages with over 3.2% alcohol could be sold.

Pope County was the location of several protests against the CU Powerline in the 1970s.

== Geography ==
Soils of Pope County

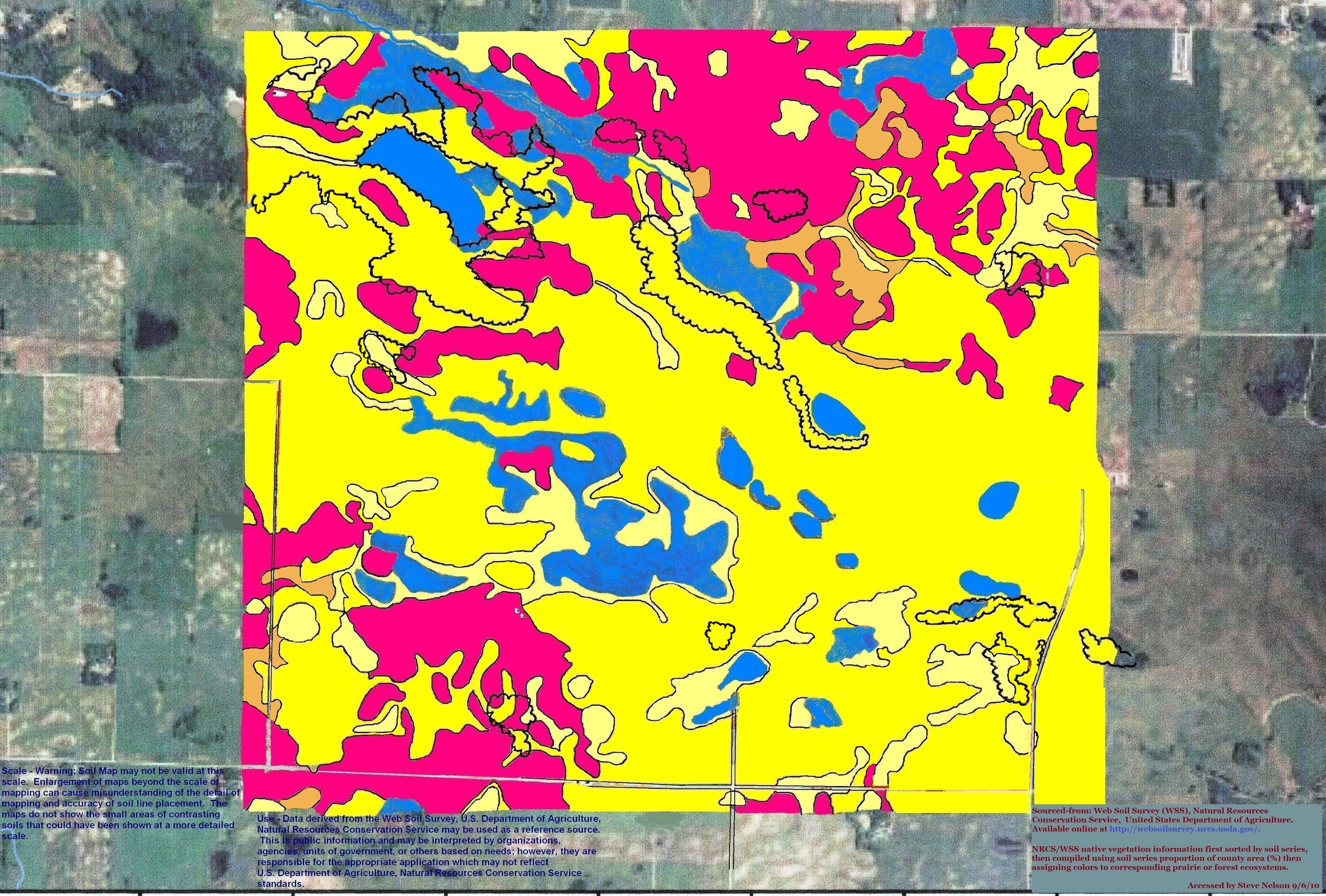
Soils of Glacial Lakes State Park area

The Chippewa River flows south through the county's western part. The Little Chippewa River flows south-southwest through its central part, discharging into the Chippewa southeast of Cyrus. The East Branch Chippewa River flows south-southwest through the eastern part of the county toward its union with the Chippewa in neighboring Swift County. The county terrain consists of low rolling hills, carved with drainages and dotted with lakes and ponds. The area is devoted to agriculture. The terrain slopes to the south and west, with its highest point near the northeast corner at 1,388 ft (423 m) ASL. The county has an area of 717 square miles (1,860 km^{2}), of which 670 square miles (1,700 km^{2}) is land and 47 square miles (120 km^{2}) (6.6%) is water.

=== Major highways ===
- Minnesota State Highway 9
- Minnesota State Highway 28
- Minnesota State Highway 29
- Minnesota State Highway 55
- Minnesota State Highway 104
- Minnesota State Highway 114

=== Airports ===
- Glenwood Municipal Airport (D32)
- Starbuck Municipal Airport (GHW)

=== Adjacent counties ===
- Douglas County - north
- Stearns County - east
- Kandiyohi County - southeast
- Swift County - south
- Stevens County - west
- Grant County - northwest

=== Protected areas ===
- Bruce Hitman Heron Rookery Scientific and Natural Area
- Farwell State Wildlife Management Area
- Glacial Lakes State Park
- Langhei Scientific and Natural Area
- Little Jo State Wildlife Management Area
- Lowry State Wildlife Management Area
- New Prairie State Wildlife Management Area
- Noordmans State Wildlife Management Area
- Skarpness State Wildlife Management Area
- Van Luik State Wildlife Management Area
- Wade State Wildlife Management Area

=== Major lakes ===
- Amelia Lake
- Goose Lake
- Lake Emily
- Lake Johanna
- Lake Minnewaska
- Lake Reno (part)
- Lake Simon
- Pelican Lake
- Pike Lake
- Scandinavian Lake

== Demographics ==
Historical population
Census	Pop.	Note	%±
1870	2,691		—
1880	5,874		118.3%
1890	10,032		70.8%
1900	12,577		25.4%
1910	12,746		1.3%
1920	13,631		6.9%
1930	13,085		−4.0%
1940	13,544		3.5%
1950	12,862		−5.0%
1960	11,914		−7.4%
1970	11,107		−6.8%
1980	11,657		5.0%
1990	10,745		−7.8%
2000	11,236		4.6%
2010	10,995		−2.1%
2020	11,308		2.8%
2025 (est.)	11,420	▲	1.0%
U.S. Decennial Census; 1790-1960 1900-1990; 1990-2000 2010-2020

=== Racial and ethnic composition ===
Pope County, Minnesota – Racial and ethnic composition Note: the US Census treats Hispanic/Latino as an ethnic category. This table excludes Latinos from the racial categories and assigns them to a separate category. Hispanics/Latinos may be of any race.
Race / Ethnicity (NH = Non-Hispanic)	Pop 1980	Pop 1990	Pop 2000	Pop 2010	Pop 2020	% 1980	% 1990	% 2000	% 2010	% 2020
White alone (NH)	11,614	10,694	11,078	10,720	10,751	99.63%	99.53%	98.59%	97.50%	95.07%
Black or African American alone (NH)	1	5	23	35	34	0.01%	0.05%	0.20%	0.32%	0.30%
Native American or Alaska Native alone (NH)	6	23	20	22	27	0.05%	0.21%	0.18%	0.20%	0.24%
Asian alone (NH)	17	12	9	39	50	0.15%	0.11%	0.08%	0.35%	0.44%
Native Hawaiian or Pacific Islander alone (NH)	x	x	1	2	0	x	x	0.01%	0.02%	0.00%
Other race alone (NH)	3	4	3	0	20	0.03%	0.04%	0.03%	0.00%	0.18%
Mixed race or Multiracial (NH)	x	x	45	82	235	x	x	0.40%	0.75%	2.08%
Hispanic or Latino (any race)	16	7	57	95	191	0.14%	0.07%	0.51%	0.86%	1.69%
Total	11,657	10,745	11,236	10,995	11,308	100.00%	100.00%	100.00%	100.00%	100.00%

=== 2020 census ===
As of the 2020 census, the county had a population of 11,308. The median age was 45.5 years. 22.1% of residents were under the age of 18 and 24.5% of residents were 65 years of age or older. For every 100 females there were 104.1 males, and for every 100 females age 18 and over there were 100.9 males age 18 and over.

The racial makeup of the county was 95.5% White, 0.3% Black or African American, 0.3% American Indian and Alaska Native, 0.4% Asian, <0.1% Native Hawaiian and Pacific Islander, 0.6% from some other race, and 2.8% from two or more races. Hispanic or Latino residents of any race comprised 1.7% of the population.

37.2% of residents lived in urban areas, while 62.8% lived in rural areas.

There were 4,862 households in the county, of which 25.9% had children under the age of 18 living in them. Of all households, 54.3% were married-couple households, 18.9% were households with a male householder and no spouse or partner present, and 20.0% were households with a female householder and no spouse or partner present. About 29.7% of all households were made up of individuals and 14.5% had someone living alone who was 65 years of age or older.

There were 6,367 housing units, of which 23.6% were vacant. Among occupied housing units, 79.3% were owner-occupied and 20.7% were renter-occupied. The homeowner vacancy rate was 1.2% and the rental vacancy rate was 10.1%.

=== 2000 census ===
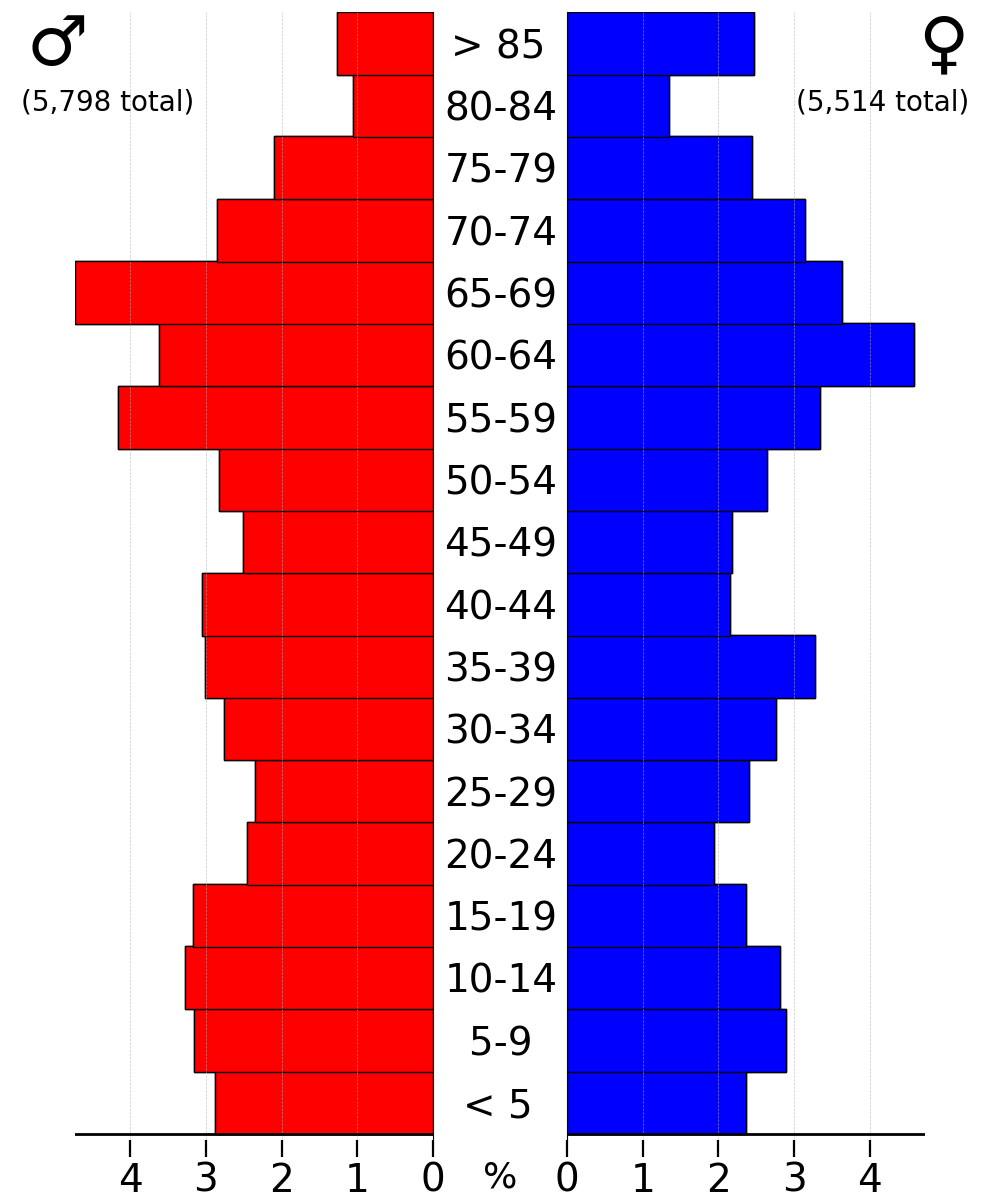
2022 US Census population pyramid for Pope County, from ACS 5-year estimates

As of the census of 2000, there were 11,236 people, 4,513 households, and 3,064 families in the county. The population density was 16.8 per square mile (6.5/km^{2}). There were 5,827 housing units at an average density of 8.70 per square mile (3.36/km^{2})/km^{2}). The racial makeup of the county was 98.85% White, 0.20% Black or African American, 0.18% Native American, 0.08% Asian, 0.01% Pacific Islander, 0.18% from other races, and 0.50% from two or more races. 0.51% of the population were Hispanic or Latino of any race. 38.8% were of Norwegian and 31.6% German ancestry.

There were 4,513 households, out of which 29.70% had children under the age of 18 living with them, 59.00% were married couples living together, 5.90% had a female householder with no husband present, and 32.10% were non-families. 28.70% of all households were made up of individuals, and 16.10% had someone living alone who was 65 years of age or older. The average household size was 2.42 and the average family size was 2.99.

The county population contained 24.80% under the age of 18, 6.70% from 18 to 24, 23.10% from 25 to 44, 23.80% from 45 to 64, and 21.50% who were 65 years of age or older. The median age was 42 years. For every 100 females there were 96.90 males. For every 100 females age 18 and over, there were 92.90 males.

The median income for a household in the county was $35,633, and the median income for a family was $42,818. Males had a median income of $30,452 versus $20,511 for females. The per capita income for the county was $19,032. About 5.80% of families and 8.80% of the population were below the poverty line, including 9.40% of those under age 18 and 12.10% of those age 65 or over.

== Communities ==
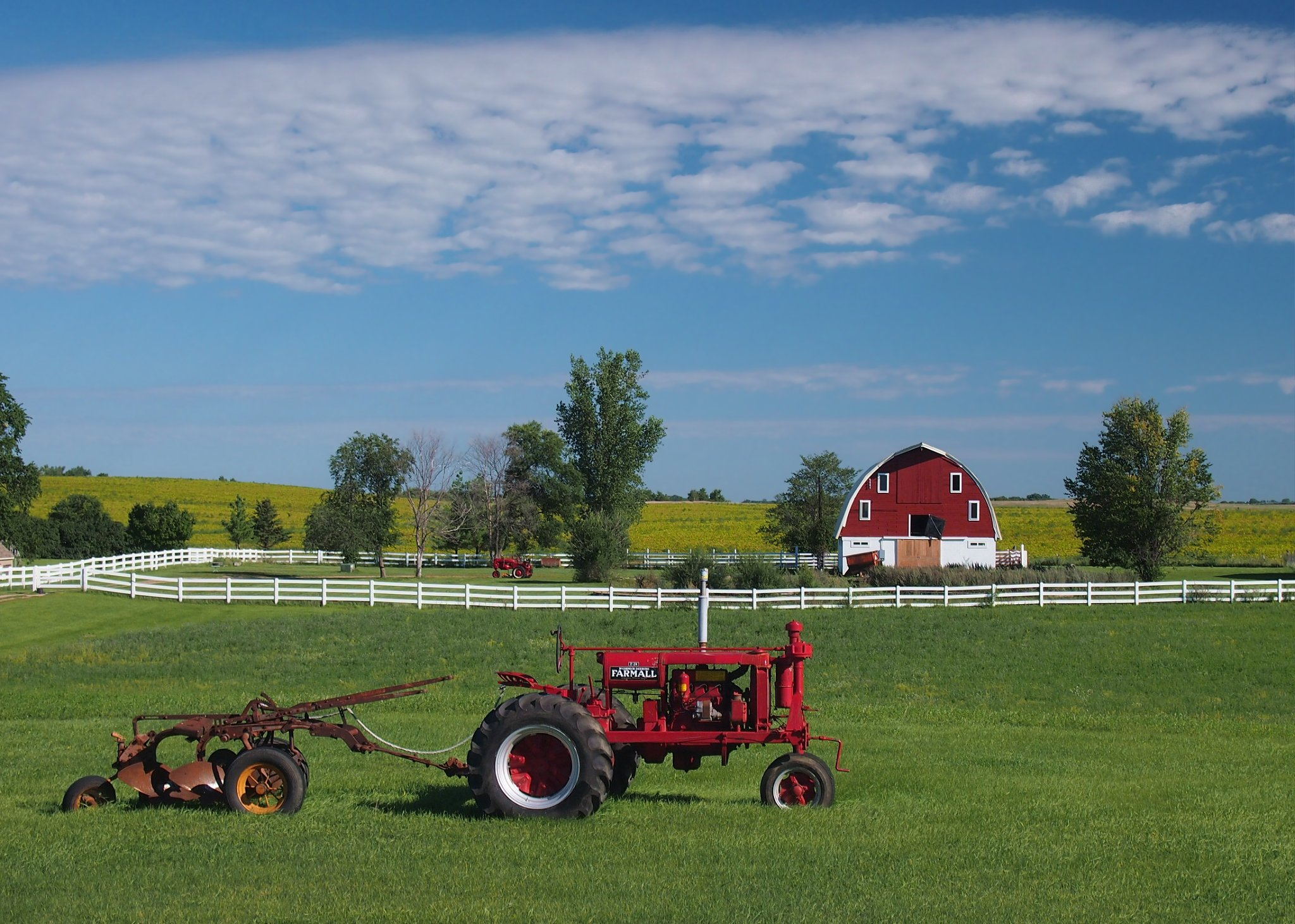
A farm in Chippewa Falls Township

=== Cities ===
- Brooten (part)
- Cyrus
- Farwell
- Glenwood (county seat)
- Long Beach
- Lowry
- Sedan
- Starbuck
- Villard
- Westport

=== Unincorporated communities ===
- Grove Lake
- Terrace

=== Ghost town ===
- New Prairie

=== Townships ===
- Bangor Township
- Barsness Township
- Ben Wade Township
- Blue Mounds Township
- Chippewa Falls Township
- Gilchrist Township
- Glenwood Township
- Grove Lake Township
- Hoff Township
- Lake Johanna Township
- Langhei Township
- Leven Township
- Minnewaska Township
- New Prairie Township
- Nora Township
- Reno Township
- Rolling Forks Township
- Walden Township
- Westport Township
- White Bear Lake Township

== Government and politics ==
Pope County has been a swing district in the past. In the 21st Century, the county has voted Republican in every election except for 2008. However, the margins were especially close in 2000, when Republican candidate George W. Bush won the county by 37 votes, and in 2004, when he won it by only 2 votes. Since 2016 the county has voted Republican by stronger margins, each of which were the best Republican performance since 1928.

United States presidential election results for Pope County, Minnesota
Year	Republican		Democratic		Third party(ies)	
Year	No.	%	No.	%	No.	%
1892	1,037	57.32%	282	15.59%	490	27.09%
1896	1,773	70.53%	688	27.37%	53	2.11%
1900	1,774	76.40%	481	20.71%	67	2.89%
1904	1,729	88.17%	159	8.11%	73	3.72%
1908	1,794	76.86%	442	18.94%	98	4.20%
1912	379	16.63%	443	19.44%	1,457	63.93%
1916	1,321	51.18%	1,121	43.43%	139	5.39%
1920	3,466	76.34%	709	15.62%	365	8.04%
1924	2,079	45.88%	151	3.33%	2,301	50.78%
1928	3,382	66.13%	1,667	32.60%	65	1.27%
1932	1,688	31.46%	3,571	66.56%	106	1.98%
1936	1,869	35.65%	3,200	61.05%	173	3.30%
1940	2,805	46.06%	3,266	53.63%	19	0.31%
1944	2,607	48.27%	2,781	51.49%	13	0.24%
1948	2,114	38.70%	3,251	59.52%	97	1.78%
1952	3,593	60.00%	2,381	39.76%	14	0.23%
1956	2,725	51.33%	2,577	48.54%	7	0.13%
1960	3,062	51.39%	2,883	48.39%	13	0.22%
1964	2,213	38.39%	3,549	61.57%	2	0.03%
1968	2,504	46.65%	2,592	48.29%	272	5.07%
1972	2,610	45.94%	2,910	51.22%	161	2.83%
1976	2,251	36.74%	3,746	61.14%	130	2.12%
1980	3,159	51.34%	2,527	41.07%	467	7.59%
1984	3,064	52.27%	2,757	47.03%	41	0.70%
1988	2,627	45.48%	3,074	53.22%	75	1.30%
1992	1,886	31.59%	2,619	43.87%	1,465	24.54%
1996	1,992	36.03%	2,803	50.70%	734	13.28%
2000	2,808	46.90%	2,771	46.28%	408	6.81%
2004	3,303	49.30%	3,301	49.27%	96	1.43%
2008	3,069	46.96%	3,317	50.75%	150	2.29%
2012	3,142	50.30%	2,981	47.73%	123	1.97%
2016	3,793	60.03%	2,106	33.33%	420	6.65%
2020	4,417	62.90%	2,477	35.27%	128	1.82%
2024	4,677	64.80%	2,398	33.22%	143	1.98%

County Board of CommissionersCounty Board of Commissioners
Position	Name	District
Commissioner	Paul Gremmels	District 1
Commissioner	Gordy Wagner	District 2
Commissioner	Paul Gerde	District 3
Commissioner	Larry Lindor	District 4
Commissioner	Paul Wildman	District 5

State Legislature (2018-2020)
Position	Name	Affiliation	District
Senate	Torrey Westrom	Republican	District 12
House of Representatives	Jeff Backer	Republican	District 12A
House of Representatives	Paul Anderson	Republican	District 12B

U.S Congress (2018-2020)
Position	Name	Affiliation	District
House of Representatives	Collin Peterson	Democrat	7th
Senate	Amy Klobuchar	Democrat	N/A
Senate	Tina Smith	Democrat	N/A

== See also ==
- National Register of Historic Places listings in Pope County, Minnesota
