= Northern Pacific Depot =

Northern Pacific Depot, Northern Pacific Railway Depot, Northern Pacific Passenger Depot, Northern Pacific Railroad Depot, or Northern Pacific Railway Passenger Depot may refer to the following stations in the United States:

== Idaho ==
- Northern Pacific Depot (Sandpoint, Idaho), listed on the National Register of Historic Places in Bonner County
- Northern Pacific Railway Depot (Wallace, Idaho), listed on the National Register of Historic Places in Shoshone County

== Minnesota ==
- Northern Pacific Depot (Aitkin, Minnesota), listed on the National Register of Historic Places in Aitkin County
- Northern Pacific Passenger Depot (Detroit Lakes, Minnesota), listed on the National Register of Historic Places listings in Becker County, Minnesota
- Northern Pacific Depot (Fergus Falls, Minnesota), listed on the National Register of Historic Places in Otter Tail County
- Northern Pacific Depot (Finlayson, Minnesota), listed on the National Register of Historic Places in Pine County
- Northern Pacific Depot (Hinckley, Minnesota), listed on the National Register of Historic Places in Pine County
- Northern Pacific Railway Depot (Little Falls, Minnesota), listed on the National Register of Historic Places in Morrison County
- Northern Pacific Depot (Starbuck, Minnesota), listed on the National Register of Historic Places in Pope County
- Northern Pacific Depot (Villard, Minnesota), listed on the National Register of Historic Places in Pope County
- Northern Pacific Passenger Depot (Wadena, Minnesota), listed on the National Register of Historic Places in Wadena County

== Montana ==
- Northern Pacific Depot (Billings, Montana), listed on the National Register of Historic Places in Yellowstone County
- Northern Pacific Passenger Depot (Livingston, Montana), listed as a contributing property on the National Register of Historic Places in Park County
- Northern Pacific Railway Depot (Miles City, Montana), listed on the National Register of Historic Places in Custer County
- Northern Pacific Railroad Depot (Missoula, Montana), listed on the National Register of Historic Places in Missoula County

== North Dakota ==
- Northern Pacific Railroad Depot (Amenia, North Dakota)
- Northern Pacific Railway Depot (Bismarck, North Dakota), listed on the National Register of Historic Places in Burleigh County
- Northern Pacific Railway Depot (Fargo, North Dakota), listed on the National Register of Historic Places in Cass County
- Northern Pacific Depot and Freight House, Grand Forks, NRHP-listed, in Grand Forks County

== Washington ==
- Northern Pacific Railway Depot (Cheney, Washington), listed on the National Register of Historic Places in Spokane County
- Northern Pacific Railway Passenger Depot (Ellensburg, Washington), listed on the National Register of Historic Places in Kittitas County
- Northern Pacific Depot (Lester, Washington), listed on the National Register of Historic Places in King County
- Northern Pacific Railway Depot (Pullman, Washington), listed on the National Register of Historic Places in Whitman County
- Northern Pacific Railway Depot (Ritzville, Washington), listed as a contributing property on the National Register of Historic Places in Adams County
- Northern Pacific Railway Depot (Tenino, Washington), listed on the National Register of Historic Places in Thurston County
- Northern Pacific Railway Passenger Depot (Walla Walla, Washington), listed on the National Register of Historic Places in Walla Walla County

== See also ==
- Category:Former Northern Pacific Railway stations
