= Ole Peterson =

Ole Peterson may refer to:

- Ole Peterson (Minnesota politician, born 1832)
- Ole Peterson (Minnesota politician, born 1835)
- Ole Peterson (Minnesota politician, born 1853)

== See also ==
- Ole Petersen (disambiguation)
