= Daniel Pennie House =

Historic house in Minnesota, United States

- U.S. National Register of Historic Places
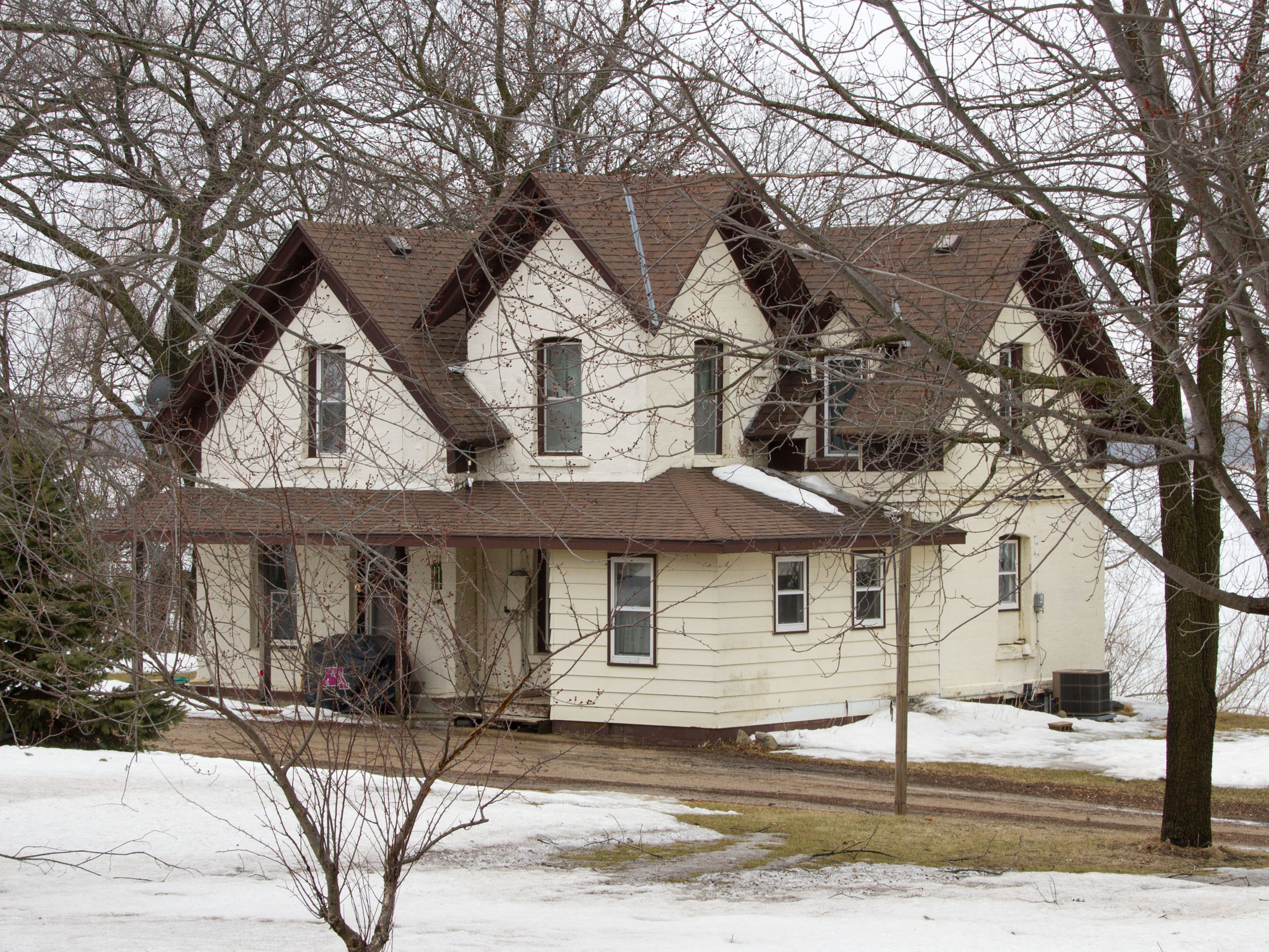
- The Daniel Pennie House from the east; one of the original porches has been enclosed using clapboard siding

- Location within Minnesota Location within the United States
- Location: County Highway 27, Leven Township, Minnesota
- Nearest city: Villard, Minnesota
- Coordinates: 45°43′56″N 95°16′36″W
- Area: Less than one acre
- Built: 1870s or 1880s
- Architect: Daniel Pennie
- MPS: Pope County MRA
- NRHP reference No.: 82003003
- Added to NRHP: April 1, 1982

The Daniel Pennie House is a historic house located in Leven Township, approximately 2 miles (3 km) north of Villard in Pope County, Minnesota, United States. It was placed on the National Register of Historic Places (NRHP) on April 1, 1982. It was nominated to the register for having local significance in settlement and construction technology. The Daniel Pennie House was built by one of Pope County's most prominent early settlers using locally distinctive construction.

== History ==
Daniel Pennie was born in Kinross-shire, Scotland in 1832. He immigrated to the United States in 1851, at age 19, changing the spelling of his last name from Penny to Pennie. Initially stopping in Connecticut, he settled in White County, Illinois, and became a stone mason. He then sent for his family and sweetheart, and they joined him in Illinois in 1853; he married that year. In 1858 the family moved to Richland County, Wisconsin; they then moved just west of St. Cloud, Minnesota, in what is now Waite Park. Once the concurrent Dakota War and Civil War subsided, the Pennies relocated further west, to Pope County and homesteaded land in what was to become Section 12 of Leven Township in 1865. He helped organize the boundaries within the county the following year, and assisted when the county seat was moved from Gilchrist Township to Glenwood. He named Leven Township and Lake Leven after Loch Leven in his native Scotland. Pennie became a widely respected citizen of Pope County. Politically, he was a Republican, and held a number of local and county offices. He became an elder of the United Presbyterian Church, and wrote poetry that was published in regional literary journals. Pennie had little skill at farming, leaving those tasks to his extended family so he could focus on working as a mason in the local region. At one point he desired to move the family once more, following work to Montana, but his wife insisted that they stay in Minnesota. He and his wife had seven children; he died in 1917 at age 85.

The first dwellings on Pennie's farm were crude shanties on the north shore of Lake Leven, then a basic log house on the eastern shore, and finally a more elaborate log house on the site of the present house. During the 1870s, he replaced the large log house with a stone-and-concrete grout house that stands today. At one point, early in its history, the home was gutted by fire, but the walls were so sturdily built that the inside was merely rebuilt within the old walls; this was a testament to Pennie's skill at masonry. Its grout construction is rare in the state and especially unique in the Pope County area, where the vast majority of houses are of frame construction.

== Structure ==
The house is a 1 1/2-story L-shaped structure with a gable roof. The walls are of grout construction, utilizing fieldstone and cement, and are scored to create grooves that imitate random ashlar stone. The water table and window sills are of brick. At the center of the "L" is a two-story tower with an intersecting gable roof, and gabled dormers pierce the main roof on both the east and west sides of the northern section. Windows are rectangular and segmentally arched, with two-over-two sash. The house's primary decorative feature is a wooden dentillated belt course which circumvents the building between the first and second stories. Chimneys pierce the roof ridge at a central position on the south gable and at the north end. There were one-story porches on the west facade and adjacent to the tower area; the one adjacent the tower area was enclosed in modern times with clapboard siding.

== See also ==
- National Register of Historic Places listings in Pope County, Minnesota
