= Glenwood Public Library =

Glenwood Public Library may refer to:

- Glenwood Public Library (Glenwood, Iowa), listed on the National Register of Historic Places in Mills County, Iowa
- Glenwood Public Library (Glenwood, Minnesota), listed on the National Register of Historic Places in Pope County, Minnesota
