= Villard station =

- Northern Pacific Depot
- U.S. National Register of Historic Places
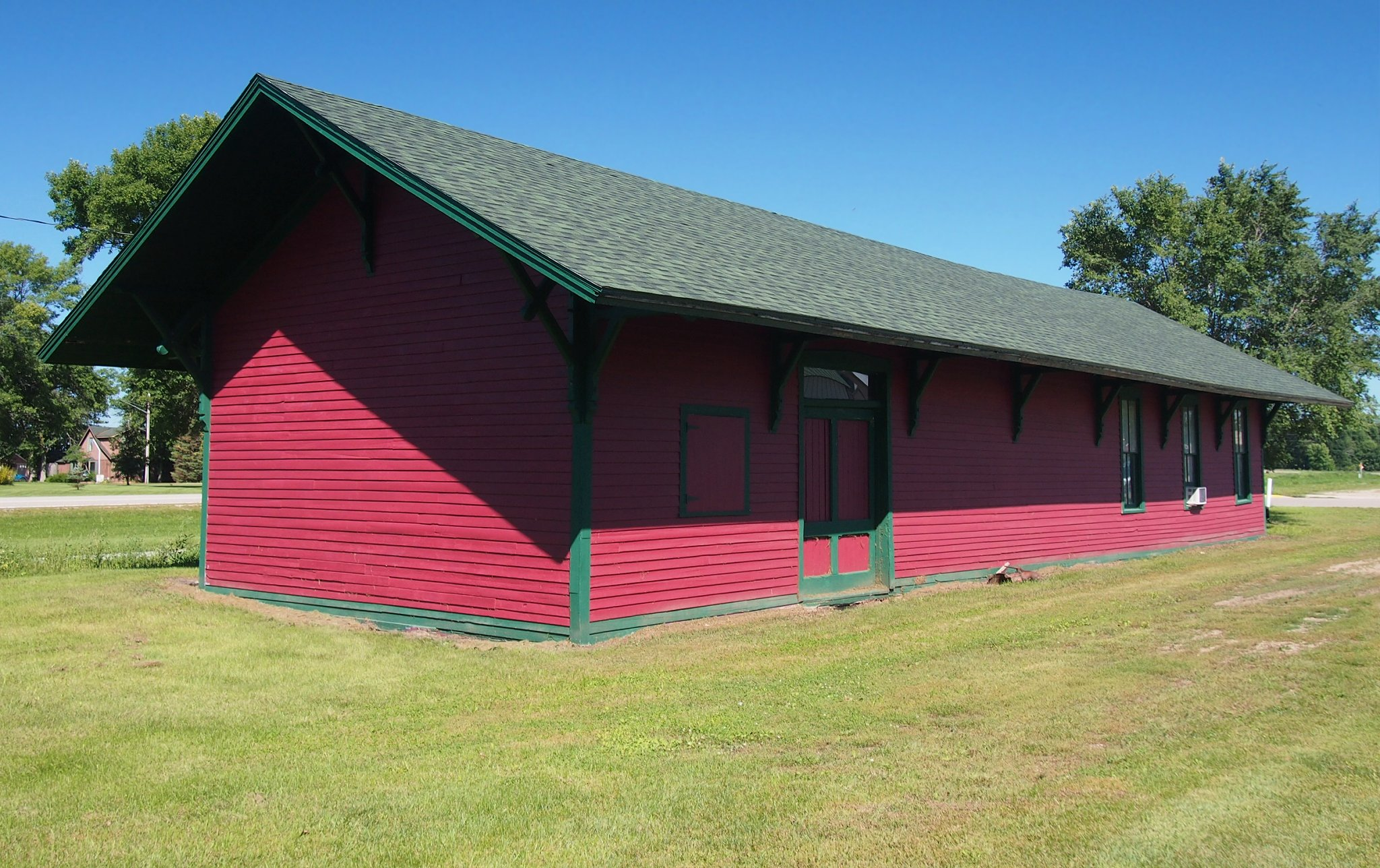
- Villard's Northern Pacific Depot from the southwest

- Location within Minnesota Location within the United States
- Location: Washington Avenue & County Highway 28, Villard, Minnesota
- Coordinates: 45°42′55.5″N 95°16′10.5″W
- Area: Less than one acre
- Built: 1882
- NRHP reference No.: 83003760
- Added to NRHP: October 6, 1983

The Northern Pacific Depot or Villard Depot is a historic railway station in Villard, Minnesota, United States, built in 1882. It is listed on the National Register of Historic Places for having local significance in exploration/settlement and transportation. The depot was constructed upon the completion of a new Northern Pacific Railway line and the platting of a new trackside town named after the railway's president Henry Villard. The Little Falls and Dakota Branch line, running between Little Falls and Morris, Minnesota, provided a key link between the agricultural region of west-central Minnesota and the Great Lakes port of Duluth. The depot now marks the eastern terminus of the Villard–Starbuck Trail, a rail trail in development from Villard through Glenwood, Starbuck, and on to Glacial Lakes State Park.

== See also ==
- National Register of Historic Places listings in Pope County, Minnesota
