= Minnewaska Hospital =

- Formerly listed on the U.S. National Register of Historic Places
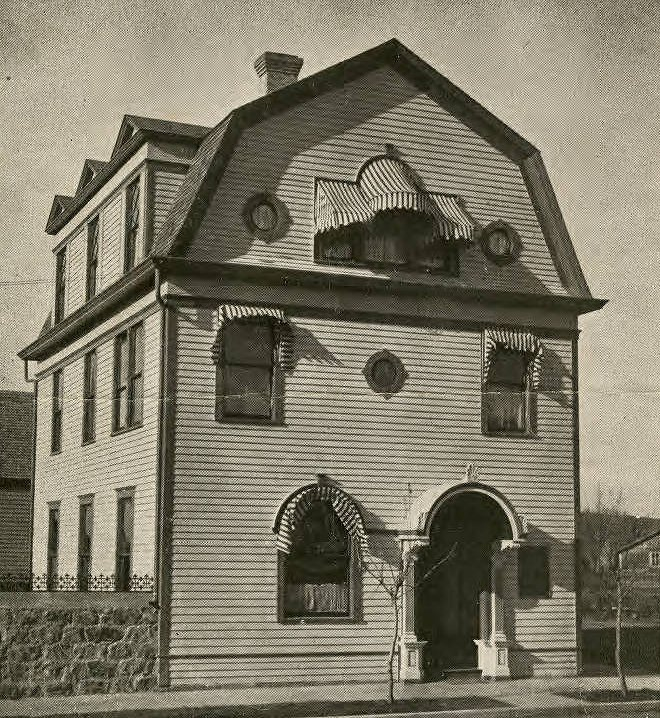
- Minnewaska Hospital

- Location within Minnesota
- Location: Wollan and Fifth Streets, Starbuck, Minnesota
- Coordinates: 45°36′44.5″N 95°31′57.5″W
- Built: 1899–1900
- NRHP reference No.: 82003002

Significant dates
- Added to NRHP: April 4, 2001
- Removed from NRHP: January 31, 2019

Minnewaska Hospital was a building in Starbuck, Minnesota, United States, on the National Register of Historic Places. When it was built 1899–1900 for Dr. C. R. Christenson, it was the only hospital between Minneapolis and Fargo, North Dakota. It was demolished in January 2013 after standing vacant for more than a decade. It was removed from the National Register in January 2019.

== See also ==
- National Register of Historic Places listings in Pope County, Minnesota
