= Glenwood Township, Pope County, Minnesota =

Glenwood Township, Minnesota
- Township
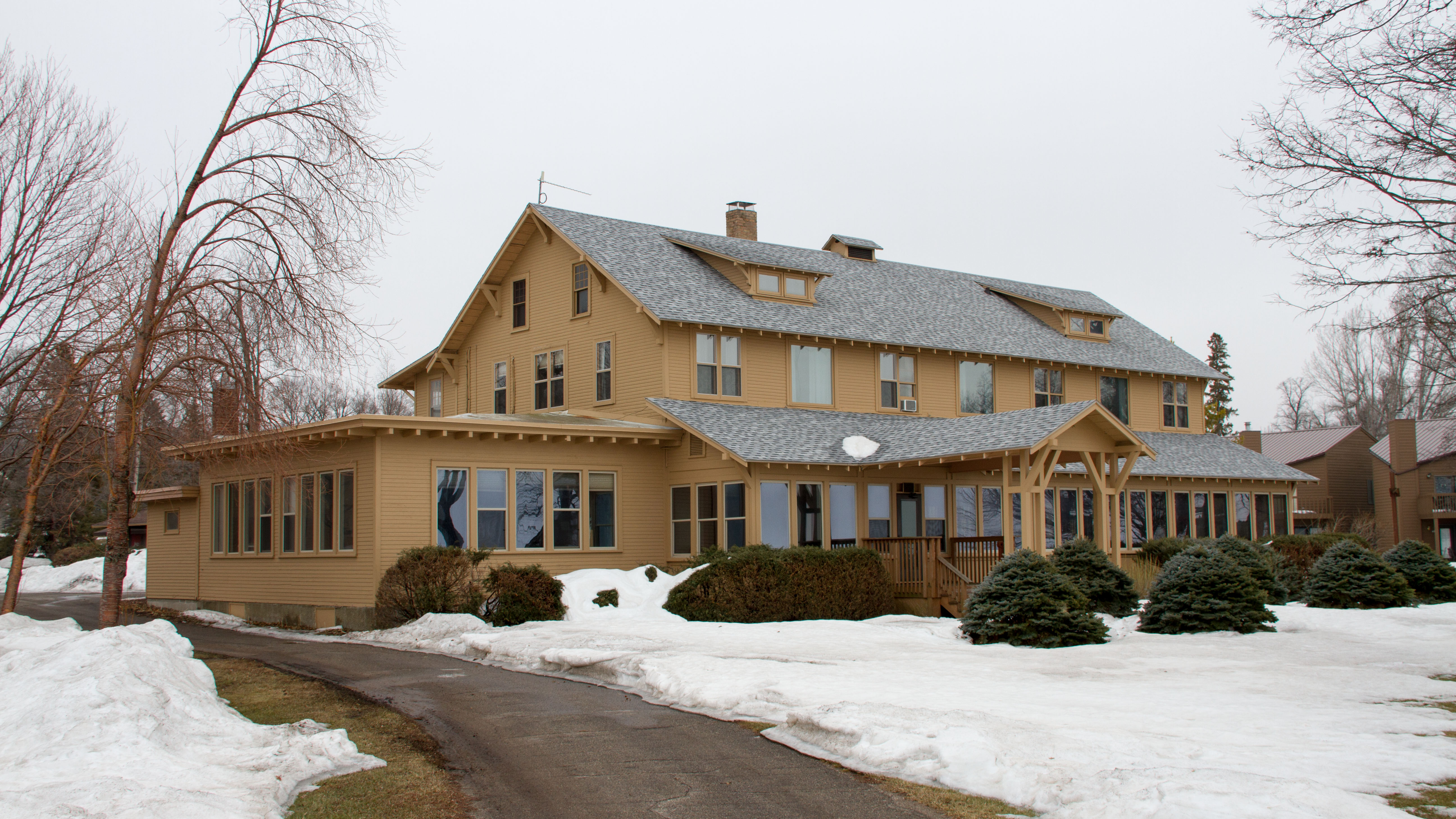
- The American Craftsman-style Sunset Beach Hotel is a historic resort on the southern shore of Lake Minnewaska and is listed on the National Register of Historic Places.

- Location within the state of Minnesota Glenwood Township, Minnesota (the United States)
- Coordinates: 45°37′40″N 95°20′28″W
- Country: United States
- State: Minnesota
- County: Pope

Area
  - Total: 41.5 sq mi (107.6 km^{2})
  - Land: 40.1 sq mi (103.8 km^{2})
  - Water: 1.5 sq mi (3.8 km^{2})
- Elevation: 1,371 ft (418 m)

Population (2000)
  - Total: 1,004
  - Density: 25/sq mi (9.7/km^{2})
- Time zone: UTC-6 (Central (CST))
  - Summer (DST): UTC-5 (CDT)
- ZIP code: 56334
- Area code: 320
- FIPS code: 27-24092
- GNIS feature ID: 0664281
- Website: https://www.glenwoodtownship.com/

Glenwood Township is a township in Pope County, Minnesota, United States. The population was 1,169 at the 2020 census.

Glenwood Township was named for the glen and woods within its borders.

== History ==
The township was surveyed in 1859 and organized in 1866.

== Geography ==
According to the United States Census Bureau, the township has a total area of 41.5 square miles (107 km^{2}), of which 40.1 square miles (104 km^{2}) is land and 1.5 square miles (3.9 km^{2}) (3.51%) is water.

== Demographics ==
As of the census of 2000, there were 1,004 people, 408 households, and 301 families residing in the township. The population density was 25.0 inhabitants per square mile (9.7/km^{2}). There were 639 housing units at an average density of 15.9 per square mile (6.1/km^{2}). The racial makeup of the township was 98.61% White, 0.10% African American, 0.30% Native American, and 1.00% from two or more races. Hispanic or Latino of any race were 0.90% of the population.

There were 408 households, out of which 29.7% had children under the age of 18 living with them, 65.9% were married couples living together, 4.2% had a female householder with no husband present, and 26.2% were non-families. 23.8% of all households were made up of individuals, and 13.0% had someone living alone who was 65 years of age or older. The average household size was 2.46 and the average family size was 2.92.

In the township the population was spread out, with 25.5% under the age of 18, 6.4% from 18 to 24, 21.8% from 25 to 44, 29.0% from 45 to 64, and 17.3% who were 65 years of age or older. The median age was 43 years. For every 100 females, there were 103.2 males. For every 100 females age 18 and over, there were 102.7 males.

The median income for a household in the township was $41,481, and the median income for a family was $44,605. Males had a median income of $31,042 versus $20,938 for females. The per capita income for the township was $26,117. About 6.3% of families and 9.6% of the population were below the poverty line, including 12.6% of those under age 18 and 7.0% of those age 65 or over.
