= Leven Township, Pope County, Minnesota =

Leven Township, Minnesota
- Township
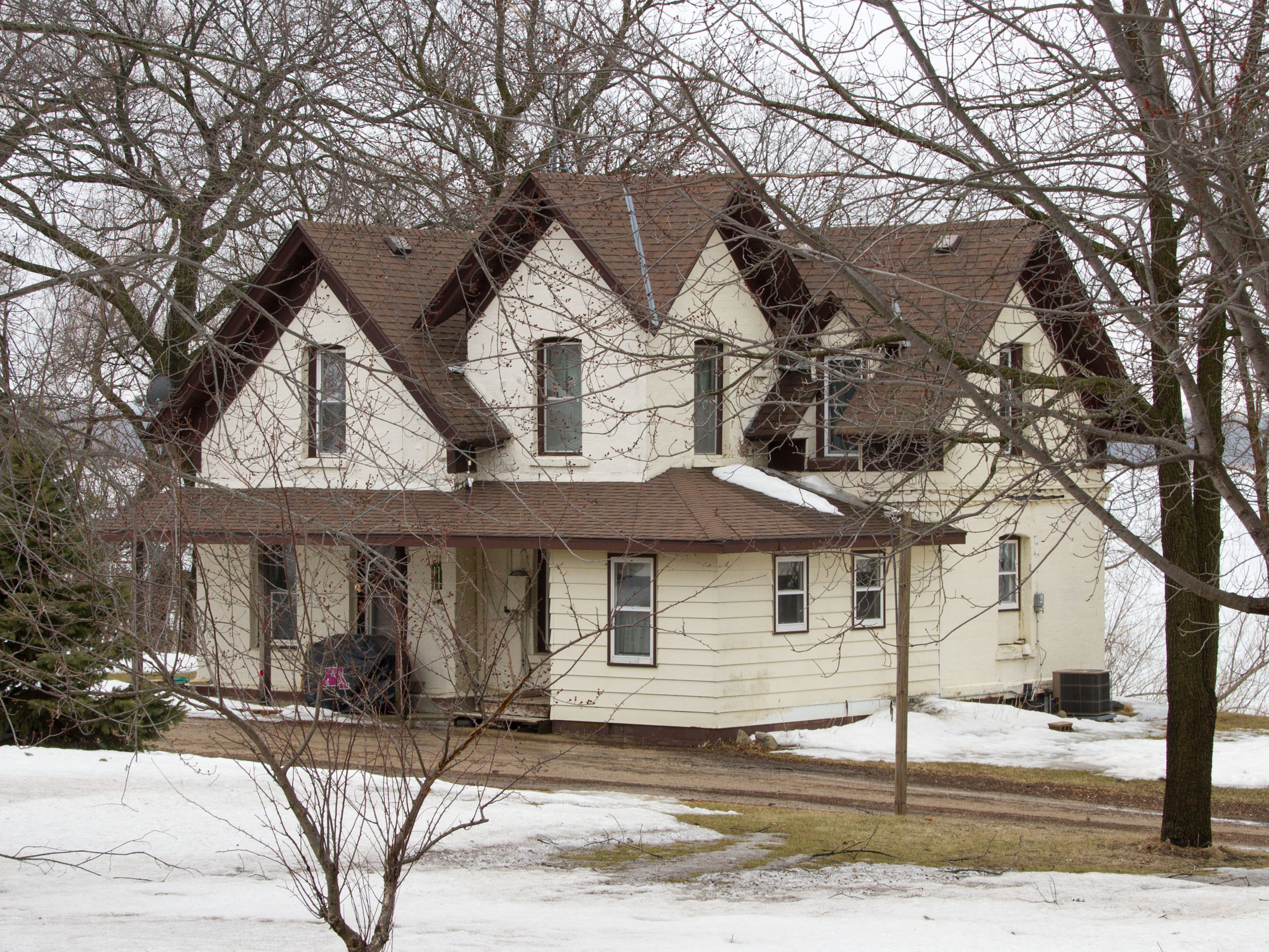
- The Daniel Pennie House, the 1870s house of a Scottish immigrant, is listed on the National Register of Historic Places.

- Location within the state of Minnesota Leven Township, Minnesota (the United States)
- Coordinates: 45°43′35″N 95°20′9″W
- Country: United States
- State: Minnesota
- County: Pope

Area
  - Total: 35.4 sq mi (91.8 km^{2})
  - Land: 32.7 sq mi (84.8 km^{2})
  - Water: 2.7 sq mi (7.1 km^{2})
- Elevation: 1,381 ft (421 m)

Population (2000)
  - Total: 528
  - Density: 16/sq mi (6.2/km^{2})
- Time zone: UTC-6 (Central (CST))
  - Summer (DST): UTC-5 (CDT)
- FIPS code: 27-36764
- GNIS feature ID: 0664768

Leven Township is a township in Pope County, Minnesota, United States. The population was 536 at the 2020 census. The township, as well as Lake Leven within its borders, were named after Loch Leven in Scotland, where one of the area's early pioneers grew up.

== Geography ==
According to the United States Census Bureau, the township has a total area of 35.5 square miles (91.8 km^{2}), of which 32.7 square miles (84.7 km^{2}) is land and 2.7 square miles (7.1 km^{2}) (7.70%) is water.

== Demographics ==
As of the census of 2000, there were 528 people, 205 households, and 152 families residing in the township. The population density was 16.1 inhabitants per square mile (6.2/km^{2}). There were 408 housing units at an average density of 12.5 per square mile (4.8/km^{2}). The racial makeup of the township was 99.81% White and 0.19% African American. Hispanic or Latino of any race were 0.19% of the population.

There were 205 households, out of which 33.2% had children under the age of 18 living with them, 68.3% were married couples living together, 2.4% had a female householder with no husband present, and 25.4% were non-families. 21.0% of all households were made up of individuals, and 9.3% had someone living alone who was 65 years of age or older. The average household size was 2.58 and the average family size was 3.04.

In the township the population was spread out, with 25.6% under the age of 18, 5.3% from 18 to 24, 25.0% from 25 to 44, 27.7% from 45 to 64, and 16.5% who were 65 years of age or older. The median age was 40 years. For every 100 females, there were 111.2 males. For every 100 females age 18 and over, there were 114.8 males.

The median income for a household in the township was $41,705, and the median income for a family was $45,156. Males had a median income of $33,000 versus $16,842 for females. The per capita income for the township was $17,197. About 3.3% of families and 4.4% of the population were below the poverty line, including 1.3% of those under age 18 and 6.5% of those age 65 or over.
