= Ole Petersen =

Ole Petersen may refer to:

- Ole Erik Petersen, 1960 Olympic Medal winner
- Ole Holger Petersen, Director of Biosciences at Cardiff University and Fellow of the Royal Society
- Ole Peter Petersen, founder of Methodism in Norway
- Ole Petersen (author), German author born 1961

== See also ==
- Ole Peterson (disambiguation)
