= Pope County Courthouse =

Courthouse in Minnesota, US

- Pope County Courthouse (Minnesota)
- U.S. National Register of Historic Places
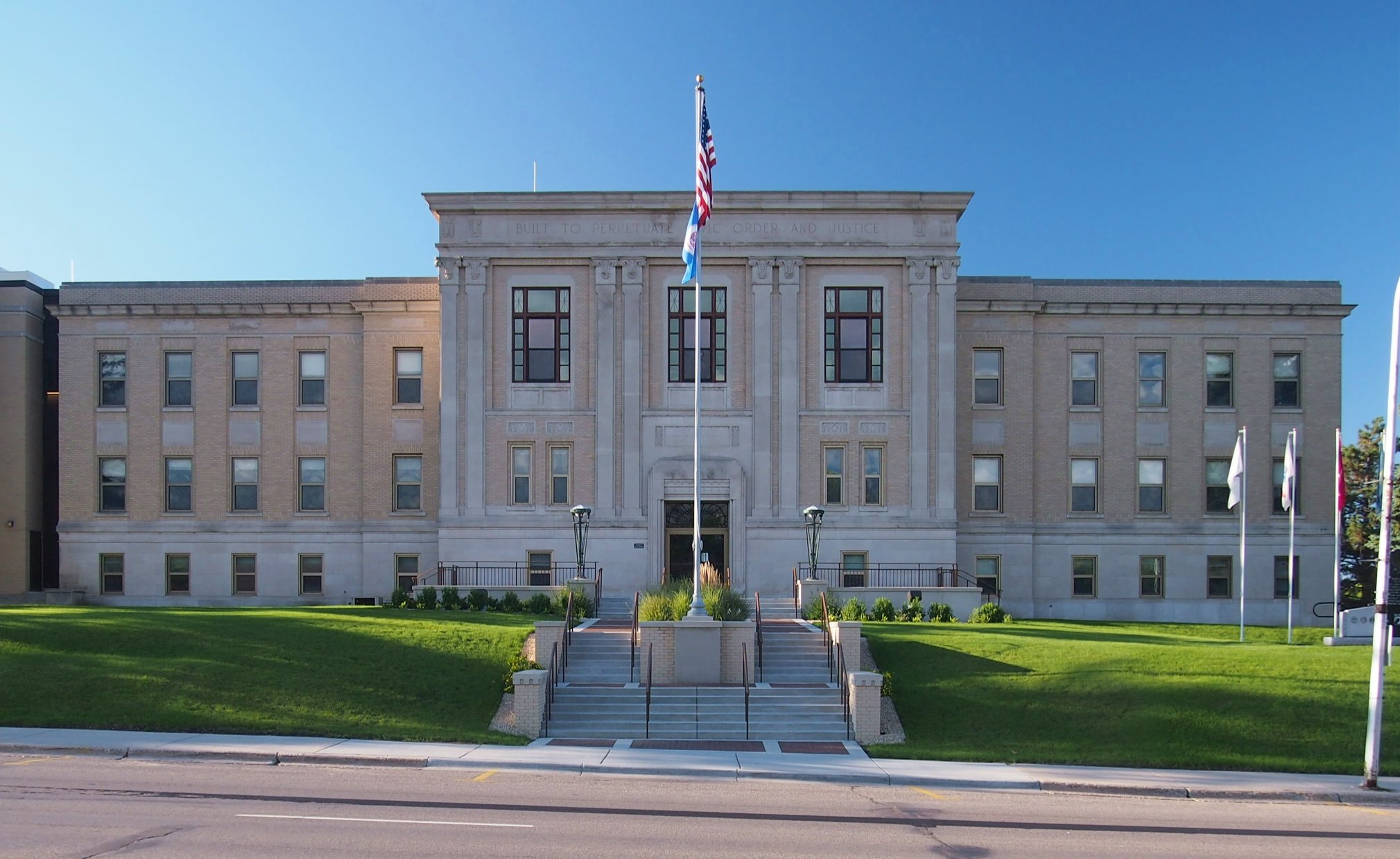
- The Pope County Courthouse from the north

- Location within Minnesota Location within the United States
- Location: 130 East Minnesota Avenue, Glenwood, Minnesota
- Coordinates: 45°38′59.5″N 95°23′16″W
- Area: Less than one acre
- Built: 1930
- Built by: Mads Madsen
- Architect: Nairne W. Fisher
- Architectural style: Beaux-Arts
- MPS: Pope County MRA
- NRHP reference No.: 82002997
- Added to NRHP: April 1, 1982

The Pope County Courthouse is the courthouse and government center of Pope County, Minnesota, United States, in the city of Glenwood. It was built in 1930 as a replacement for a prior courthouse on the same site dating to 1879. The current courthouse is listed on the National Register of Historic Places for having local significance in politics/government and architecture. Its historic significance derives from being the long-serving seat of Pope County government and for being a well-preserved example of the replacement courthouses built in a few Minnesota counties in the 1930s.

Architect Nairne W. Fisher of St. Cloud Minnesota also designed the Art Deco style Glenwood High School, located a few blocks from the courthouse. The school building has been repurposed as a performance and visual arts space named Central Square Arts & Cultural Center.

== See also ==
- National Register of Historic Places listings in Pope County, Minnesota
