= Sunset Beach Hotel =

- U.S. National Register of Historic Places
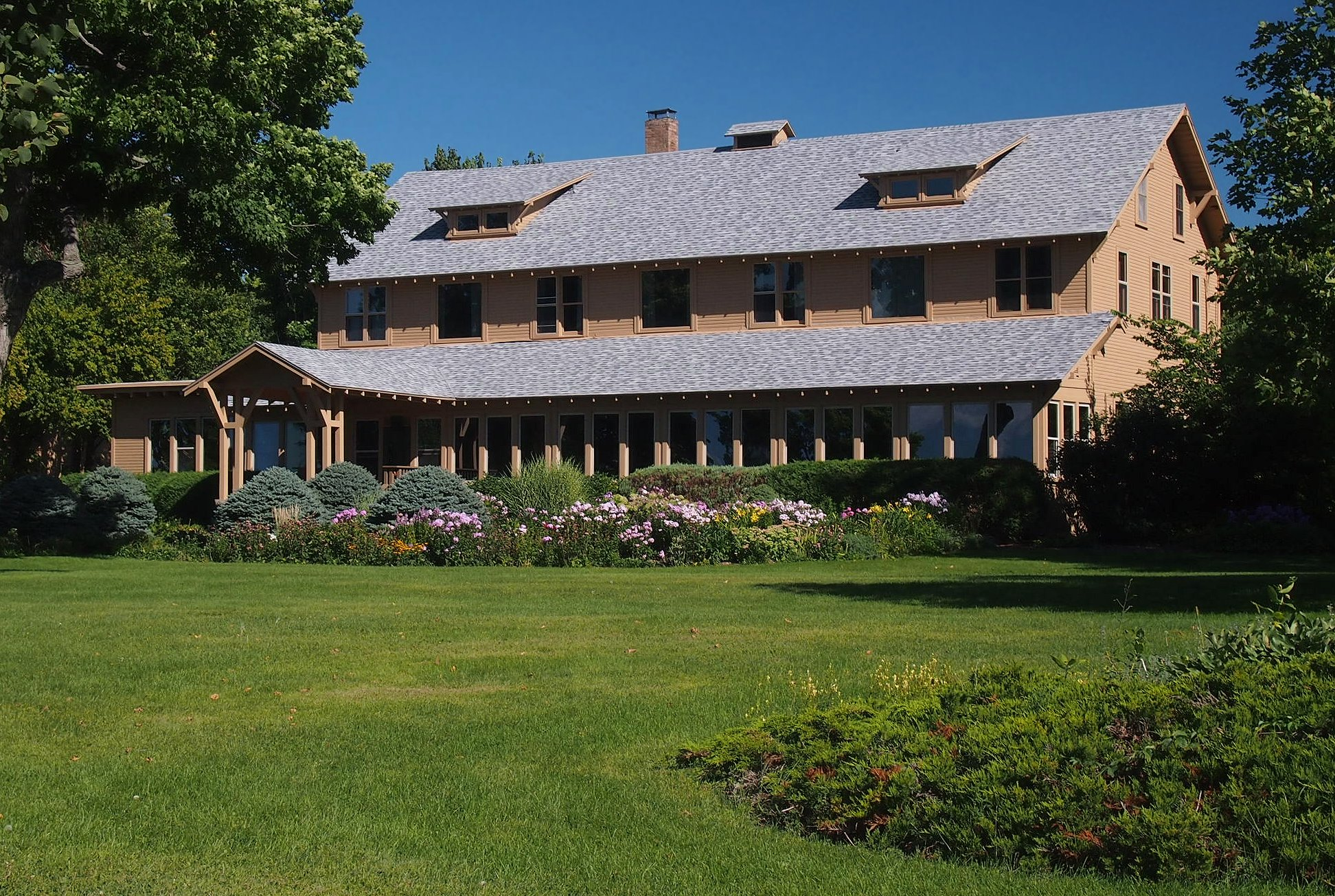
- Sunset Beach Hotel's main lodge, built in 1915

- Location within Minnesota Location within the United States
- Location: 20000 South Lakeshore Drive, Glenwood Township, Minnesota
- Nearest city: Glenwood, Minnesota
- Coordinates: 45°36′51″N 95°24′38″W
- Area: 2 acres (0.81 ha)
- Built: 1915 (Main Lodge), 1927 (Annex Building), 1930 (Court Building)
- Built by: Larson Bros.
- NRHP reference No.: 82002998
- Added to NRHP: February 11, 1982

The Sunset Beach Hotel, also referred to as Peters' Sunset Beach Resort, is a historic resort hotel in Glenwood Township, Minnesota, five miles (8 km) southwest of Glenwood, United States. Situated on the southern shore of Lake Minnewaska, three structures of the private, commercial resort were placed on the National Register of Historic Places (NRHP) on February 11, 1982. The complex is notable because it stands as one of the best-preserved early resorts in west central Minnesota, and as a center of seasonal resort activity on the lake since the second decade of the twentieth century.

== History ==
By the end of the 19th century, the southwest section of shoreline along Lake Minnewaska had become popular with residents of North Dakota. They built summer homes and created the "Camp Dakota" subdivision, platted in 1905. Henry P. Peters, a resident of Enderlin, North Dakota and a conductor on the Soo Line railroad, which passed through nearby Glenwood, purchased a cottage in 1908. Peters quit the railroad in 1912 and moved to Estevan, Saskatchewan, Canada, where he quickly found success in the construction industry. Saving a few thousand dollars, he decided to move permanently to Glenwood in 1914. He and his wife organized a company to build the "Glenwood Summer Hotel". That building, now the Main Lodge, opened on June 1, 1915. By 1918, Peters was able to buy out the other stockholders and secure a controlling interest in the resort; the name was soon changed to Sunset Beach Hotel. The name caught on and soon "Sunset Beach" became the name for the area around the hotel. Despite having little formal education himself, Peters managed to send his children to Shattuck Military Academy and the University of Wisconsin. The Peters family has continuously run the resort since then, adding additional buildings and facilities over time. During the Great Depression, Peters and his wife managed to keep the hotel afloat, even when a severe drought caused the lake to lower far enough that a road had to be built from the hotel to the lake. Pushing the lake's fishing potential, particularly for walleye, Peters made light of the fact that "the walleyes didn't know there was a depression going on."

The resort's Main Lodge, Annex, and Court Building were deemed to be outstanding examples of the simple functional style of early lake resorts, contrasting with the more ostentatious log resort buildings built for the northern Minnesota resorts of the 1920s. The resort is of historic interest for its link with the early development of one of Pope County's significant aspects, its seasonal population.

Additional small cottages, as well as other structures and facilities, have been added to the resort over the years; however these structures have been significantly altered since their construction and were not included in the nomination to the NRHP. In 1962 the owners decided to add a golf course, now named the Pezhekee National Golf Course, which opened with four holes in 1965 and expanded into a nine-hole course by 1967.

== Structures ==
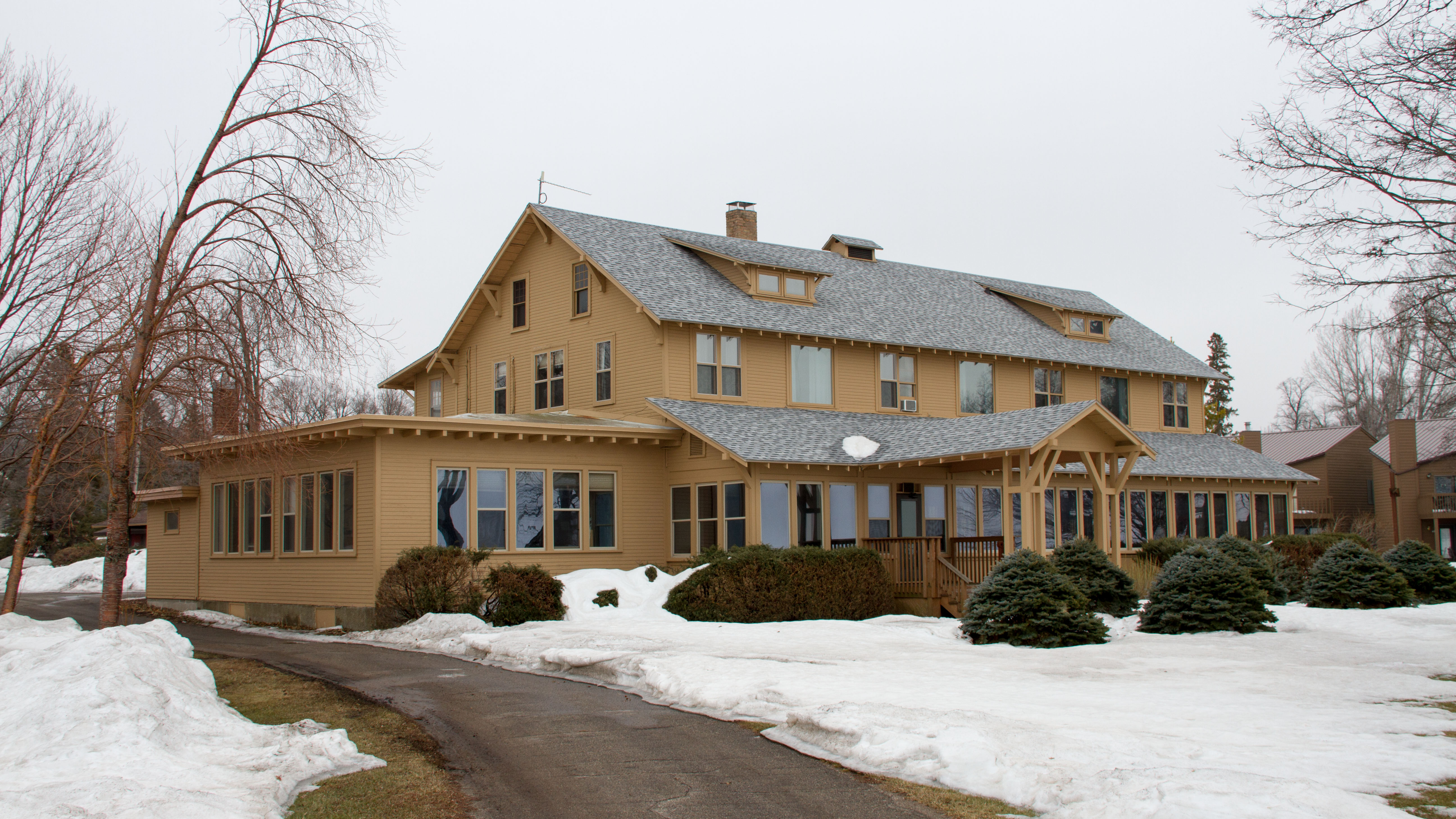
The Main Lodge, built in 1915

The three pivotal resort structures listed on the NRHP are arranged around a central open area fronting the lake. These buildings, the Main Lodge, the Annex, and the Court Building, are designed in a simple American Craftsman style and have retained excellent design integrity.

The Main Lodge (1915) is a two-story frame gable roofed building. Simple Midwest bungalow detailing includes craftsman-style brackets in the gables and exposed rafter ends. Fenestration includes both single and paired rectangular double-hung windows. The building is sheathed in clapboard. The full front porch, originally screened, has been enclosed and a porte-cochère added over the front entrance; this was deemed sympathetic to the original design in the NRHP nomination. Other changes have included the addition of a one-story sun room to the north, shed dormers on the roof, and additions to the rear of the buildings.

The interior of the Main Lodge includes a lobby, sun room, dining room, kitchen, and office on the main floor and guest rooms on the second floor. There have been cosmetic alterations to the interior, but the main floor retained its original basic room arrangement and some original features, including a stone fireplace in the lobby. The dining room is decorated with panels illustrating local Native American lore painted by Gustav Krollman (1888–1962). Born in Vienna, Krollman studied painting at the Academy of Fine Arts Vienna and served as an officer in the Austro-Hungarian Army during World War I before traveling the world and settling in Minneapolis by 1923. His work rose to fame in the United States when he started creating paintings to promote tourist destinations for the Northern Pacific Railway, and he later became an instructor at what is now the Minneapolis College of Art and Design.

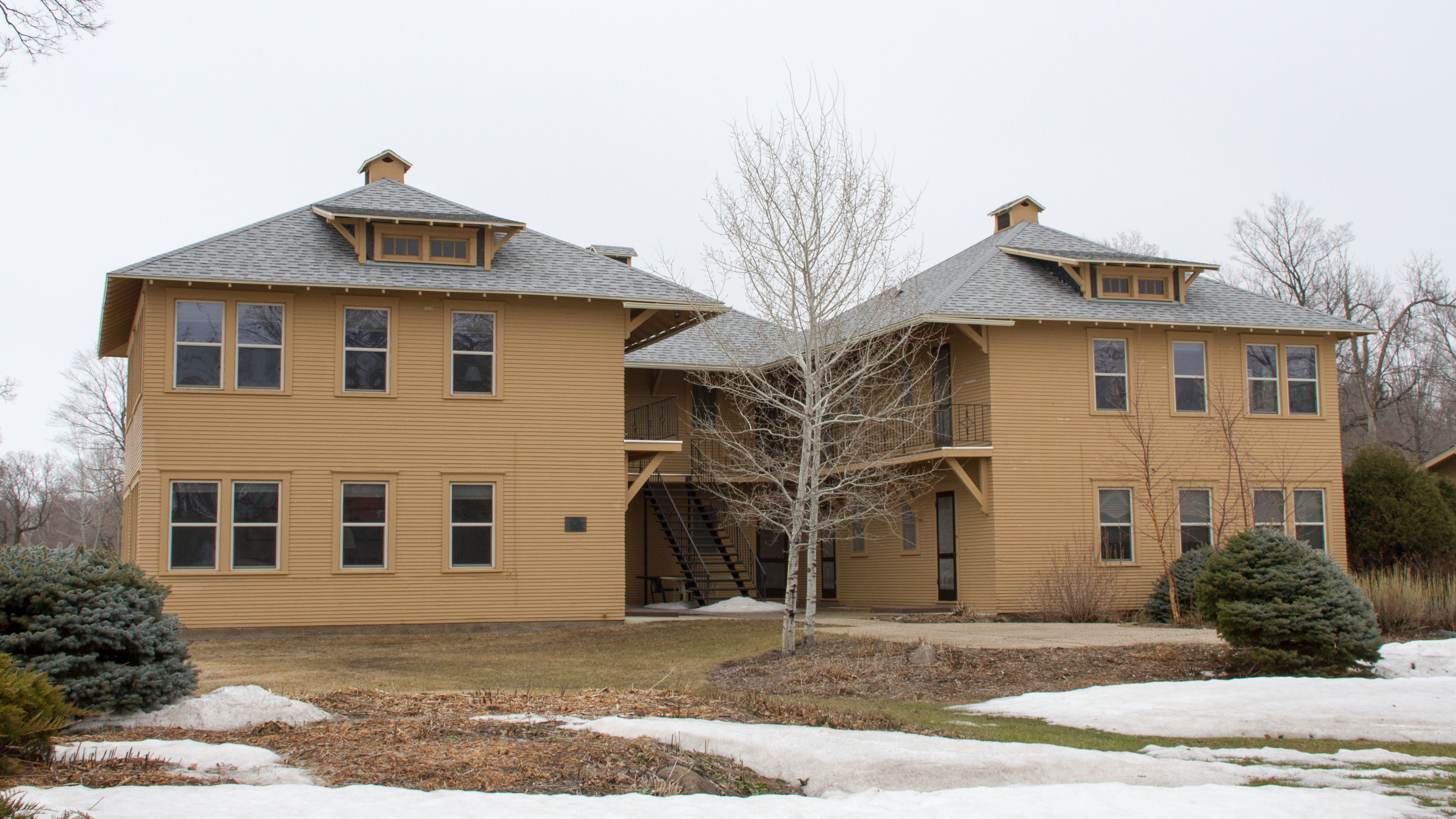
The Court Building, built in 1930

The Annex Building (1927) is at the southwest end of the central area, and is constructed in a style similar to the main lodge. The rectangular building has two stories with a projecting two-story screen porch at the front, and features a hip roof with gambrel dormers, clapboard siding, brackets, and exposed rafter ends. Each of the two stories includes four guest rooms opening on a central hallway.

The Court Building (1930) is located at the northwest end of the central area. This building is composed of three rectangular units arranged around a central court. Like the other buildings, it features clapboard siding, exposed rafter ends, and craftsman-style brackets. Each section is capped with a hip roof with gabled vents at the peaks, and features irregularly spaced rectangular windows. The court area includes a second story balcony on three sides; the original wooden balustrade has been replaced with a metal rail. The interior of each section includes two apartments on each floor.

== See also ==
- National Register of Historic Places listings in Pope County, Minnesota
