= Little Falls and Dakota Depot =

- U.S. National Register of Historic Places
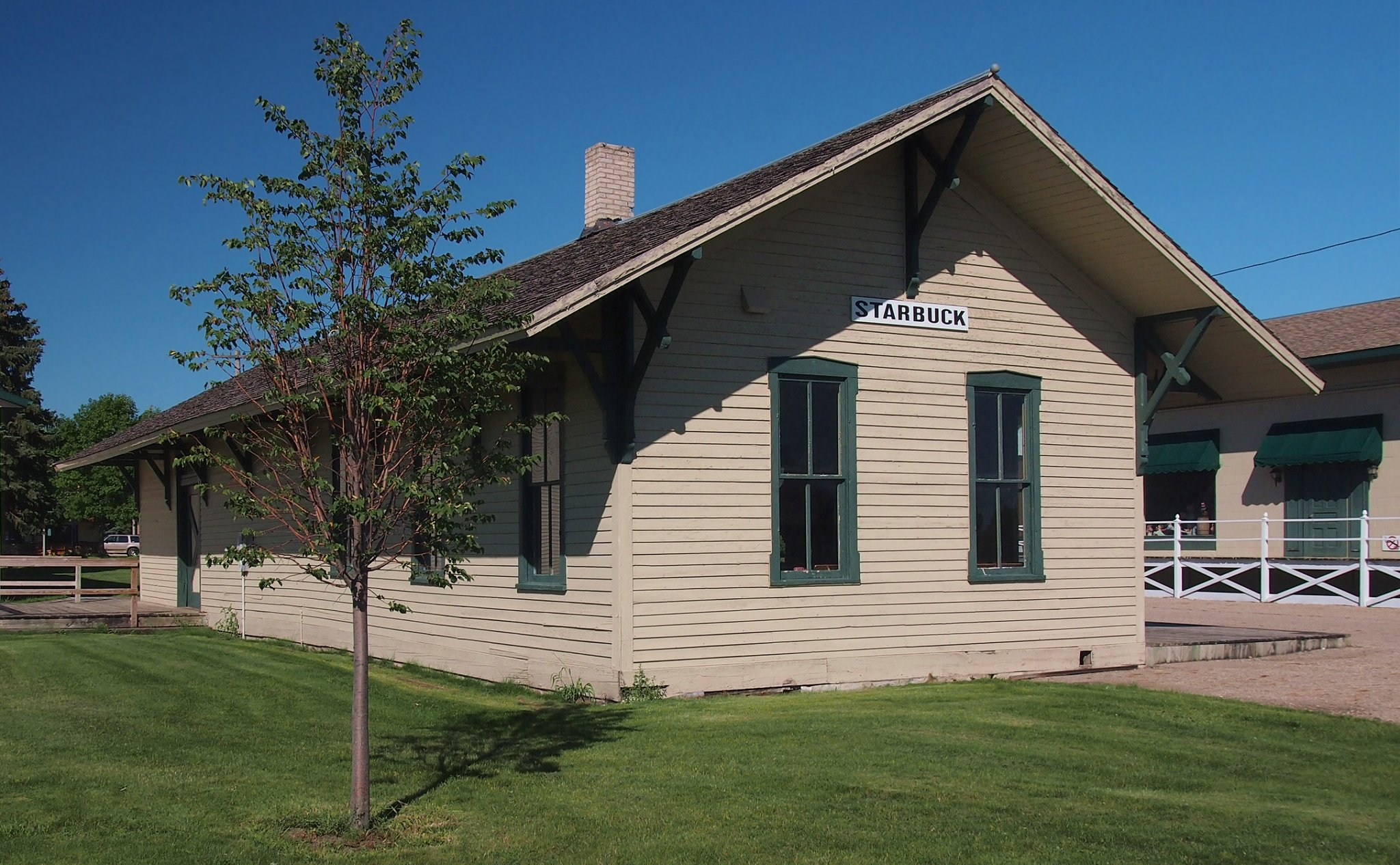
- The depot from the southeast

- Location within Minnesota Location within the United States
- Location: Depot Lane, Starbuck, Minnesota
- Coordinates: 45°36′42″N 95°31′50.5″W
- Area: .83 acres (0.34 ha)
- Built: 1882
- Built by: DeGraff and Company
- NRHP reference No.: 06000424
- Added to NRHP: May 24, 2006

The Little Falls and Dakota Depot, also called the Starbuck Depot, is a former railway station in Starbuck, Minnesota. It was in service from 1882 to 1982. The depot was listed on the National Register of Historic Places in 2006 for its local significance under the themes of commerce, exploration/settlement, and transportation. It was nominated for its associations with the expansion of rail lines and European settlement into the region, and the growth of Starbuck as an agricultural trade center. The depot was restored beginning in 1986 by the non-profit Starbuck Depot Society, and it is now part of an open-air museum.

== History ==
East–west rail lines had been laid across Minnesota by the early 1870s, but they did not cross Pope County and settlement remained low. In 1879 local entrepreneurs incorporated the Little Falls and Dakota Railroad to build a new east–west branch line from Little Falls, Minnesota, to the Dakota border. The Northern Pacific Railway and Great Northern Railway, locked in a rivalry for national dominance, each took an interest in the new region and the lucrative land rights that would come with it. The Great Northern hurriedly built tracks for the St. Cloud and Lake Traverse Railway from Browns Valley Junction, about 1.5 miles (2.4 km) south of Morris, Minnesota, and south of the Little Falls and Dakota Line; building the line east towards Starbuck. However the Little Falls and Dakota, secretly backed by Northern Pacific, reached Starbuck first, securing the critical mail franchise for the town, and then continuing on to Morris. Great Northern traffic was light so the Morris-to-Starbuck section of the St. Cloud and Lake Traverse was abandoned not long after the line was completed. Upon completion in 1882 the Little Falls and Dakota line was immediately leased by the Northern Pacific and purchased outright in 1900.

For Starbuck's centennial celebration on July 1, 1983, the world's largest lefse was cooked on the depot grounds. Since 1987 the city has held an annual Lefse Dagen festival on the site.

== See also ==
- National Register of Historic Places listings in Pope County, Minnesota

Preceding station	Northern Pacific Railway	Following station
Morris Terminus	Morris Branch	Sauk Center toward Little Falls
