= Urjans Iverson House =

Historic house in Minnesota, United States

- U.S. National Register of Historic Places
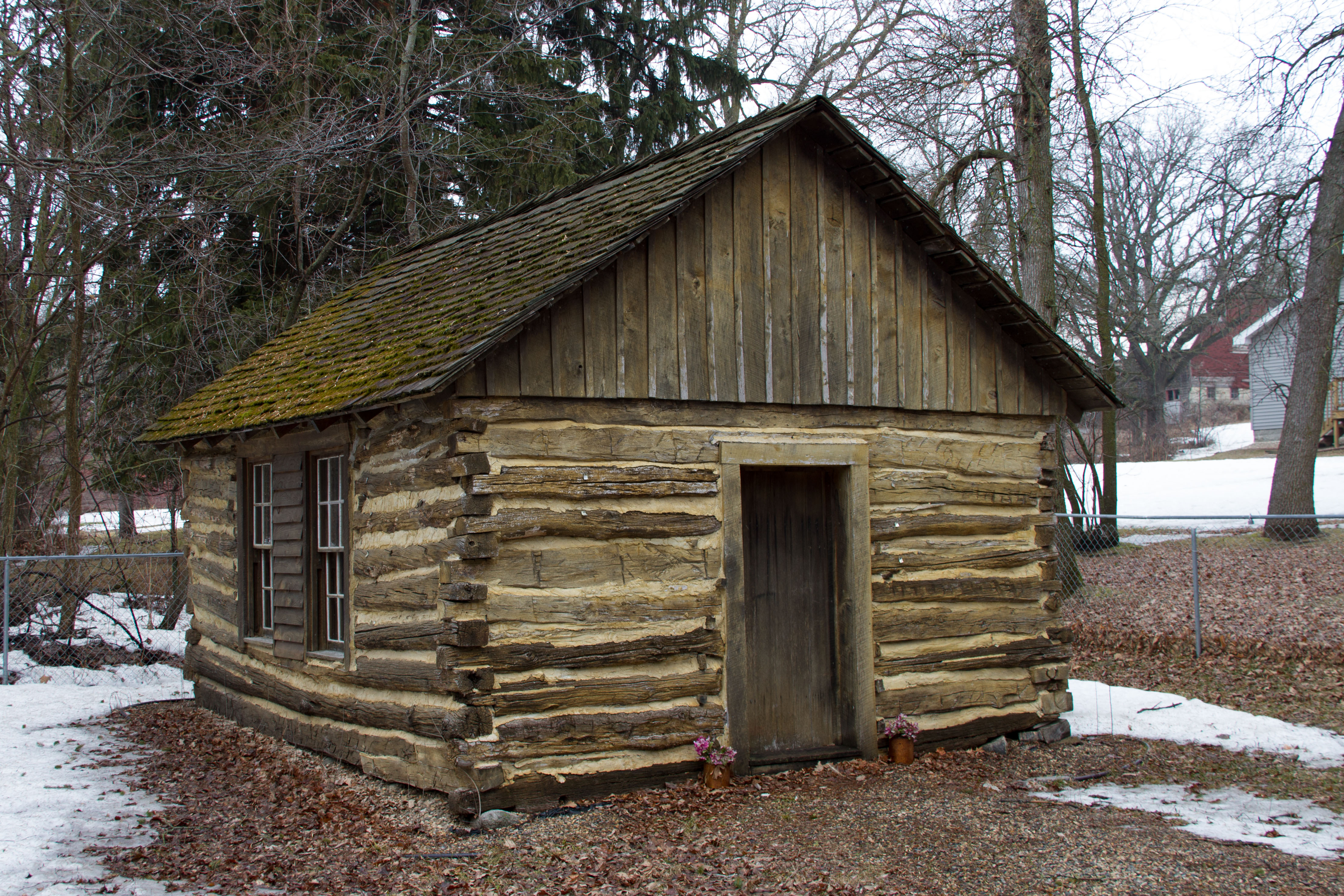
- The Urjans Iverson House from the southeast

- Location within Minnesota Location within the United States
- Location: 31039 Minnesota Highway 104, Gilchrist Township, Minnesota
- Nearest city: Sedan, Minnesota
- Coordinates: 45°27′13.2″N 95°15′19.6″W
- Area: Less than one acre
- Built: 1866
- Architect: Urjans Iverson
- NRHP reference No.: 82003001
- Added to NRHP: February 11, 1982

The Urjans Iverson House is a historic log cabin in Gilchrist Township, Minnesota, United States, built in 1866. It was restored in 1990 and is preserved within Fort Lake Johanna Roadside Park off Minnesota State Highway 104. The cabin was listed on the National Register of Historic Places in 1982 for its local significance in the theme of exploration/settlement. It was nominated for its broad associations with the early settlement of Pope County.

== History ==
The Urjans Iverson House was built in 1866 near Lake Johanna, an early focus of Euro-American settlement in Pope County. Four families had homesteaded around the lake in 1862, but fled the area when the Dakota War of 1862 broke out and didn't return until 1864. The following year the 2nd Minnesota Volunteer Cavalry Regiment constructed Fort Lake Johanna nearby, one of many short-lived frontier outposts established after the war due to ongoing fear of Native American attack.

Urjans Iverson immigrated from Hardanger, Norway, to the United States, arriving in Spring Prairie, Wisconsin, in 1854. He was one of several Norwegian immigrants to arrive in the Lake Johanna area in the mid-1860s, and he used some logs from the already-abandoned army outpost to build his cabin. Iverson moved southeast to Kandiyohi County in 1868. The following year the Lake Johanna settlers began using the empty cabin as the district's first schoolhouse, and also held church services there until 1874.

== See also ==
- National Register of Historic Places listings in Pope County, Minnesota
