= Fremad Association Building =

- U.S. National Register of Historic Places
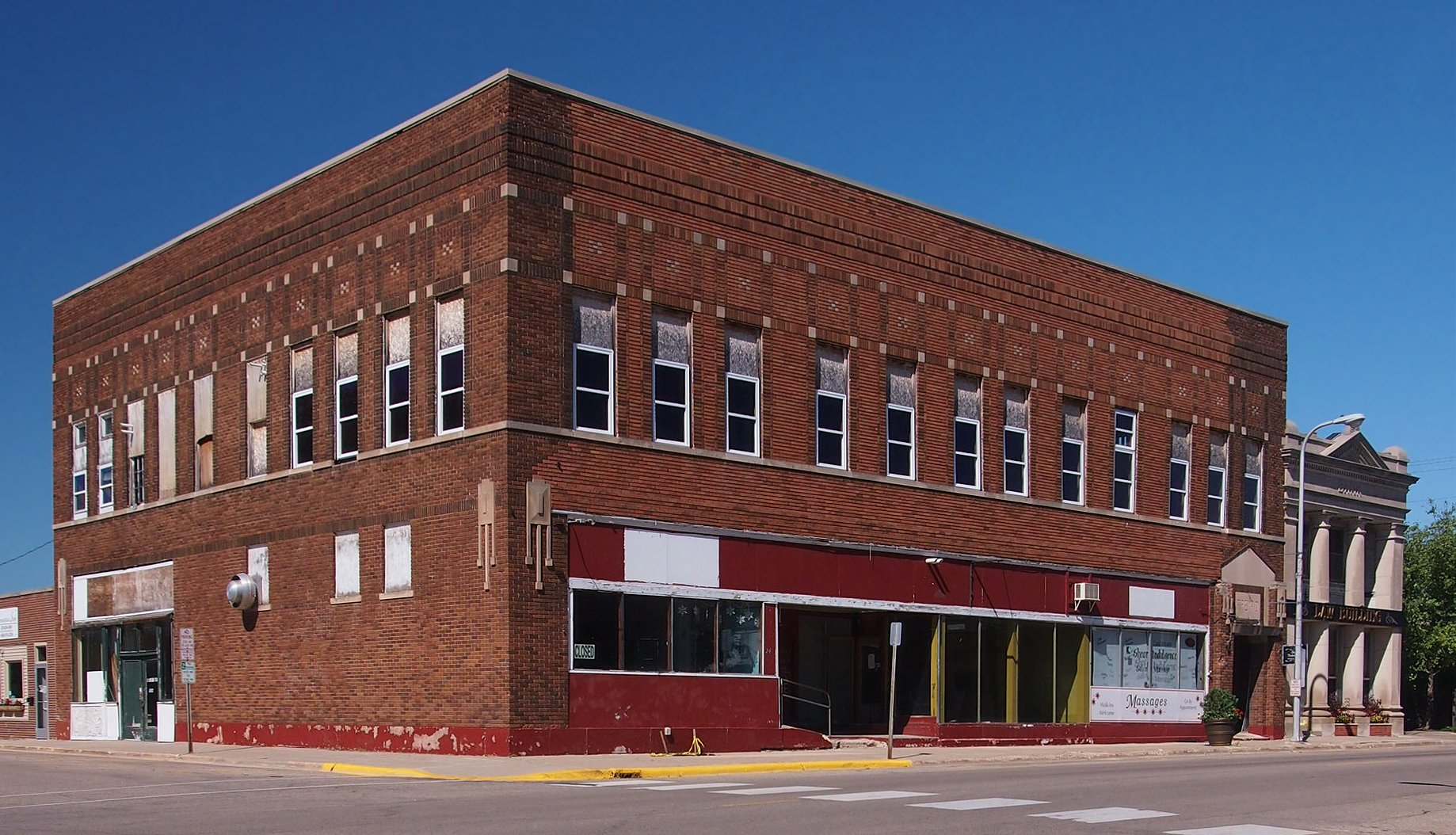
- The Fremad Association Building and Pope County State Bank from the southeast

- Location within Minnesota Location within the United States
- Location: 2–22 South Franklin St., Glenwood, Minnesota
- Coordinates: 45°38′58.4″N 95°23′25.3″W
- Area: Less than one acre
- Built: 1893/1919 (Fremad), 1908 (bank)
- Architectural style: Neoclassical
- NRHP reference No.: 82002995
- Added to NRHP: April 1, 1982

The Fremad Association Building and adjacent Pope County State Bank Building were historic commercial properties in Glenwood, Minnesota.

== Description and history ==
They were listed together on the National Register of Historic Places for their local significance in commerce and architecture. They formed a hub of commerce in Pope County, Minnesota, from the late-19th to the mid-20th century, while the bank was further noted for its Neoclassical architecture. Pope County received the Fremad building in 2014 from tax forfeiture. Attempts to sell the buildings were unsuccessful. The buildings were demolished in 2023.

== See also ==
- National Register of Historic Places listings in Pope County, Minnesota
