= Ole Peterson (Minnesota politician, born 1832) =

American farmer, grain dealer, and politician (1832–1891)

Member of the Minnesota House of Representatives from the 4th district
- In office January 2, 1883 – January 5, 1885 Serving with L. T. Bell
- Preceded by: Multiple-member district
- Succeeded by: Multiple-member district

Personal details
- Born: 16 February 1832 Sigdal, Norway
- Died: 31 May 1891 (aged 59) Manchester Township, Minnesota, U.S.
- Party: Independent
- Spouse: Eliza Gulbrandsdatter Rugland
- Children: 6
- Profession: Farmer, grain dealer

Ole Peterson (February 16, 1832 – May 31, 1891) was an American farmer, grain dealer, and politician. He served in the Minnesota House of Representatives from 1883 to 1885.

== Biography ==
Peterson was born on February 16, 1832, in Sigdal, Norway, the son of Peder Olsen Slette and Mari Halvorsdatter. He emigrated to the United States in 1851, originally settling in Illinois. On December 20, 1852, Peterson married Ingeborg (Eliza) Gulbrandsdatter Rugland. The couple had six children. Peterson moved to Minnesota in 1856. His family was one of the first six Norwegian families to settle in Manchester Township, Freeborn County.

On January 1, 1862, Peterson enlisted to fight for the Union Army in the American Civil War. He was commissioned a first lieutenant in the 15th Wisconsin Infantry Regiment, Company K, which he helped organize. The company was also known as "Clausen’s Guards". Peterson was mustered into service at Madison, Wisconsin. However, he became sick in June and resigned from the army on August 30, 1862, under the authority of General Henry Halleck.

Following his military service, Peterson became a prominent farmer and grain dealer in Manchester Township. In 1882, The Albert Lea Enterprise reported that he was "fatting 150 hogs", noting that there were "very few men in the county who own more porkers than that." Peterson was elected as the town supervisor in 1875. He was re-elected in 1876, 1877, 1878, 1879, and 1880. In 1882, Peterson was elected to the Minnesota House of Representatives as an independent, representing its 4th district from January 2, 1883, to January 5, 1885 (alongside Republican L. T. Bell). (Note: He should not be confused with Ole Peterson, who represented the 41st district during the same legislative session.) He was a member of the Grain and Warehouse Inspection committee.

Peterson died of stomach cancer on May 30, 1891, at his farm in Manchester Township.
