= Ole Peterson (Minnesota politician, born 1835) =

American farmer and politician (1835–1891)

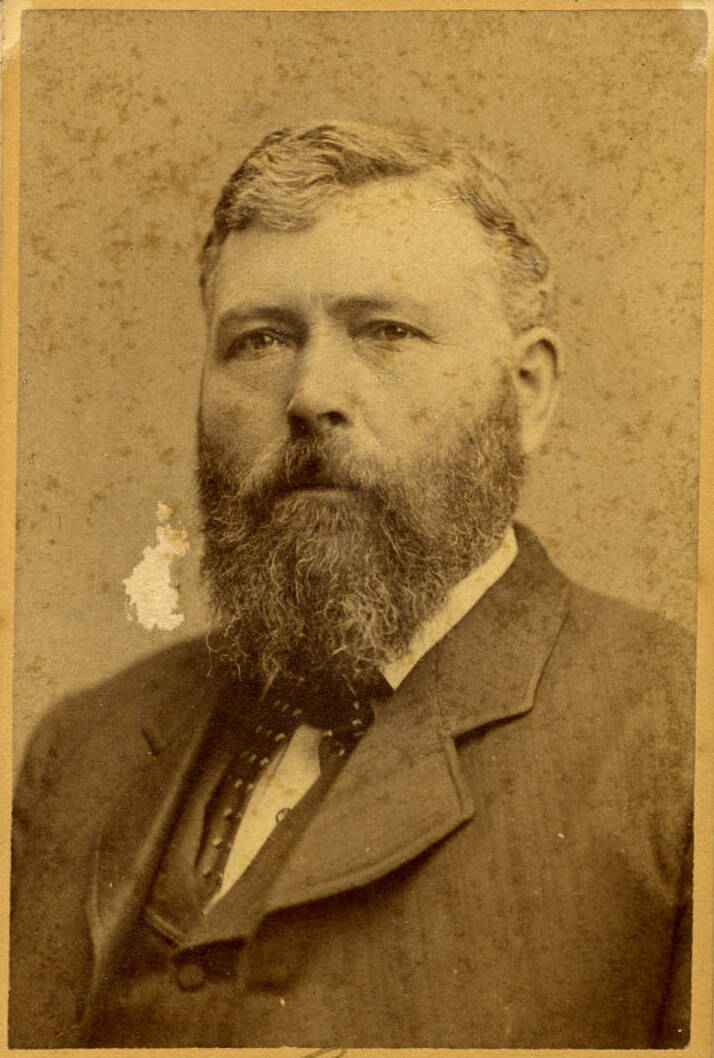
- Peterson, c. 1870

Member of the Minnesota House of Representatives from the 41st district
- In office January 2, 1883 – January 5, 1885 Serving with James H. Van Dyke
- Preceded by: Multiple-member district
- Succeeded by: Multiple-member district

Member of the Minnesota Senate from the 39th district
- In office January 2, 1872 – January 6, 1873
- Preceded by: Position established
- Succeeded by: James G. Whittemore

Personal details
- Born: 20 December 1835 Norway
- Died: 28 July 1891 (aged 55) St. Peter, Minnesota, US
- Resting place: Gilchrist Township, Minnesota, US
- Children: 4
- Profession: Farmer

Ole Peterson (December 20, 1835 – July 28, 1891) was an American farmer and politician. He served in the Minnesota Senate from 1872 to 1873 and in the Minnesota House of Representatives from 1883 to 1885.

== Biography ==
Peterson was born in Norway on December 20, 1835, and emigrated to the United States in 1857. He reached La Crosse, Wisconsin, and attended school part-time before serving in the 8th Missouri Infantry for two years in the American Civil War. Peterson arrived in Minnesota in 1865. He became one of the first settlers of Pope County, Minnesota, and worked as a farmer. In 1867, Peterson was selected as the county's first sheriff. He subsequently served as the county treasurer from 1868 to 1870.

Peterson served in the Minnesota Senate from January 2, 1872, to January 6, 1873, representing its 39th district in the 14th Minnesota Legislature. He chaired the Public Lands committee and served on the Immigration and Towns and Counties committees. At the time, Peterson reported his residence as Glenwood. He was succeeded by Republican James G. Whittemore, also of Glenwood, who went on to represent the 39th district for three terms.

In June 1874, Peterson was nominated by President Ulysses S. Grant to be receiver of public moneys at the Land Office at St. Cloud. He was confirmed by the U.S. Senate the following week, and served in the post for four years.

Peterson then served in the Minnesota House of Representatives from January 2, 1883, to January 5, 1885, representing its 41st district in the 23rd Minnesota Legislature. (Note: He should not be confused with Ole Peterson, who represented the 4th district during the same legislative session.) He served alongside Republican James H. Van Dyke in a dual-member district. Peterson chaired the Roads, Bridges and Navigable Streams committee and served on the Education, Joint Forestry, and Military Affairs committees. By this time, he reported his residence as Gilchrist Township.

Peterson was married and had four children. He died on July 28, 1891, in St. Peter, Minnesota, and was buried in Gilchrist. An obituary in The Minneapolis Times described him as having been "a prominent citizen of [Pope C]ounty."
