= Manchester Township, Freeborn County, Minnesota =

Township in Minnesota, United States

Manchester Township
- Township
- Location within the state of Minnesota Manchester Township (the United States)
- Coordinates: 43°42′34″N 93°27′29″W
- Country: United States
- State: Minnesota
- County: Freeborn

Area
  - Total: 35.9 sq mi (93.1 km^{2})
  - Land: 35.7 sq mi (92.4 km^{2})
  - Water: 0.31 sq mi (0.8 km^{2})
- Elevation: 1,280 ft (390 m)

Population (2000)
  - Total: 469
  - Density: 13/sq mi (5.1/km^{2})
- Time zone: UTC-6 (Central (CST))
  - Summer (DST): UTC-5 (CDT)
- ZIP code: 56007
- Area code: 507
- FIPS code: 27-39734
- GNIS feature ID: 0664886

Manchester Township is a township in Freeborn County, Minnesota, United States. The population was 469 at the 2000 census.

Manchester Township was organized in 1858, and named after Manchester Township, Illinois, the former home of an early settler.

== Geography ==
According to the United States Census Bureau, the township has a total area of 36.0 square miles (93.1 km^{2}), of which 35.7 square miles (92.4 km^{2}) is land and 0.3 square mile (0.8 km^{2}) (0.81%) is water.

== Demographics ==
As of the census of 2000, there were 469 people, 167 households, and 138 families residing in the township. The population density was 13.2 inhabitants per square mile (5.1/km^{2}). There were 174 housing units at an average density of 4.9 per square mile (1.9/km^{2}). The racial makeup of the township was 99.36% White, 0.43% from other races, and 0.21% from two or more races. Hispanic or Latino of any race were 0.64% of the population.

There were 167 households, out of which 37.1% had children under the age of 18 living with them, 76.6% were married couples living together, 4.8% had a female householder with no husband present, and 16.8% were non-families. 15.6% of all households were made up of individuals, and 7.2% had someone living alone who was 65 years of age or older. The average household size was 2.78 and the average family size was 3.11.

In the township the population was spread out, with 28.4% under the age of 18, 5.5% from 18 to 24, 27.1% from 25 to 44, 25.8% from 45 to 64, and 13.2% who were 65 years of age or older. The median age was 40 years. For every 100 females, there were 105.7 males. For every 100 females age 18 and over, there were 112.7 males.

The median income for a household in the township was $48,281, and the median income for a family was $50,938. Males had a median income of $29,286 versus $20,625 for females. The per capita income for the township was $18,910. About 4.5% of families and 4.0% of the population were below the poverty line, including 5.7% of those under age 18 and none of those age 65 or over.
