= Ole Peterson (Minnesota politician, born 1853) =

American farmer and politician (1853–1931)

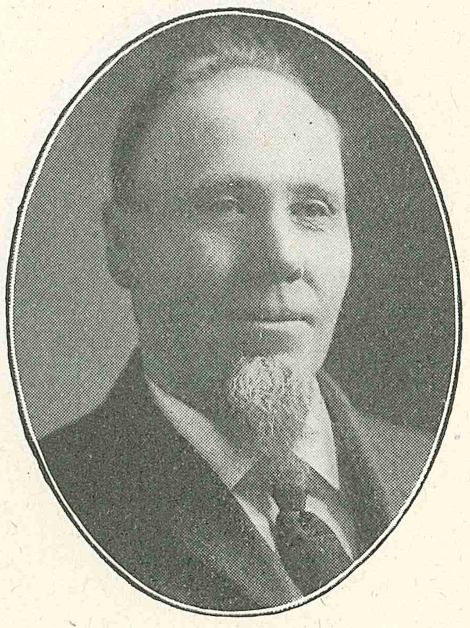
- 1911 legislative portrait

Member of the Minnesota House of Representatives from the 20th district
- In office January 4, 1909 – January 5, 1913
- Preceded by: T. O. Haugen
- Succeeded by: Oscar A. Swenson
- In office January 5, 1903 – January 6, 1907
- Preceded by: J. B. Bean
- Succeeded by: T. O. Haugen

Personal details
- Born: March 8, 1853 Transtrand, Sweden
- Died: January 5, 1931 (aged 77)
- Party: Republican
- Profession: Farmer

Ole Peterson (March 8, 1853 – January 5, 1931) was an American farmer and politician. He served two terms in the Minnesota House of Representatives from 1903 to 1906 and from 1909 to 1912 as a member of the Republican Party.

== Biography ==
Peterson was born on March 8, 1853, in Transtrand, Dalarna, Sweden, and emigrated to the United States in 1870, arriving in Minnesota. He settled in Nicollet County, Minnesota, and was alternatively reported as residing in the adjacent rural townships of Bernadotte and Brighton. Peterson worked as a bonanza farmer, growing crops such as corn. He was a prominent member of several local organizations. In 1899, Peterson was elected to the board of directors of the New Sweden Farmers' Insurance Company. In 1904, he was chosen as president of both the Nicollet County Creamery and Dairymen's Association and the Nicollet County Good Roads Association. He also held a leadership role at the New Sweden Farmers' Mutual Insurance Company.

In 1902, Peterson was elected unopposed to the Minnesota House of Representatives as a Republican. He represented its 20th district from January 5, 1903, to January 6, 1907, as a member of the 33rd and 34th Minnesota Legislatures. Peterson served on the Agriculture; Census; Drainage; Forestry and Fire Protection; Hospitals for Insane; Insurance; and Roads, Bridges and Navigable Streams committees. After being re-elected without opposition in 1904, he was defeated in the 1906 Republican primary by T. O. Haugen.

During his time in the House, Peterson became known as an ardent supporter of the Good Roads Movement. He was called the "Father of Good Roads (Legislation)".

Peterson was elected to the Minnesota House of Representatives for a second time in 1908. He won a three-man primary race for the Republican nomination before beating John Havemeier in the general election. Once again, Peterson represented the 20th district, serving two more terms in the 36th and 37th state legislatures from January 4, 1909, to January 5, 1913. Aside from chairing the State Hospitals committee, he served on the Agriculture, Hospital for Insane, Insurance, Municipal Legislation, Prison Labor, Reapportionment, and Roads and Bridges committees. Peterson was re-elected in 1910, beating Havemeier in a rematch, before losing in the 1912 Republican primary to future House Speaker Oscar A. Swenson. He subsequently unsuccessfully challenged for a seat in the Minnesota Senate in 1914 and 1916.

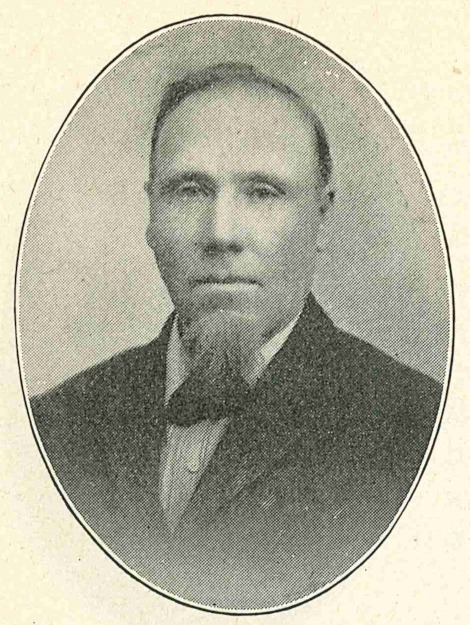
1909 legislative portrait

Peterson was married. One of his sons, Theodore, was killed by a kick from his horses after being thrown from his wagon near Lafayette, Minnesota, in February 1908. Peterson died on January 5, 1931, a few weeks after suffering an apoplectic stroke. He was survived by his widow, two daughters, and one son.
