= Gilchrist Township, Pope County, Minnesota =

Gilchrist Township, Minnesota
- Township
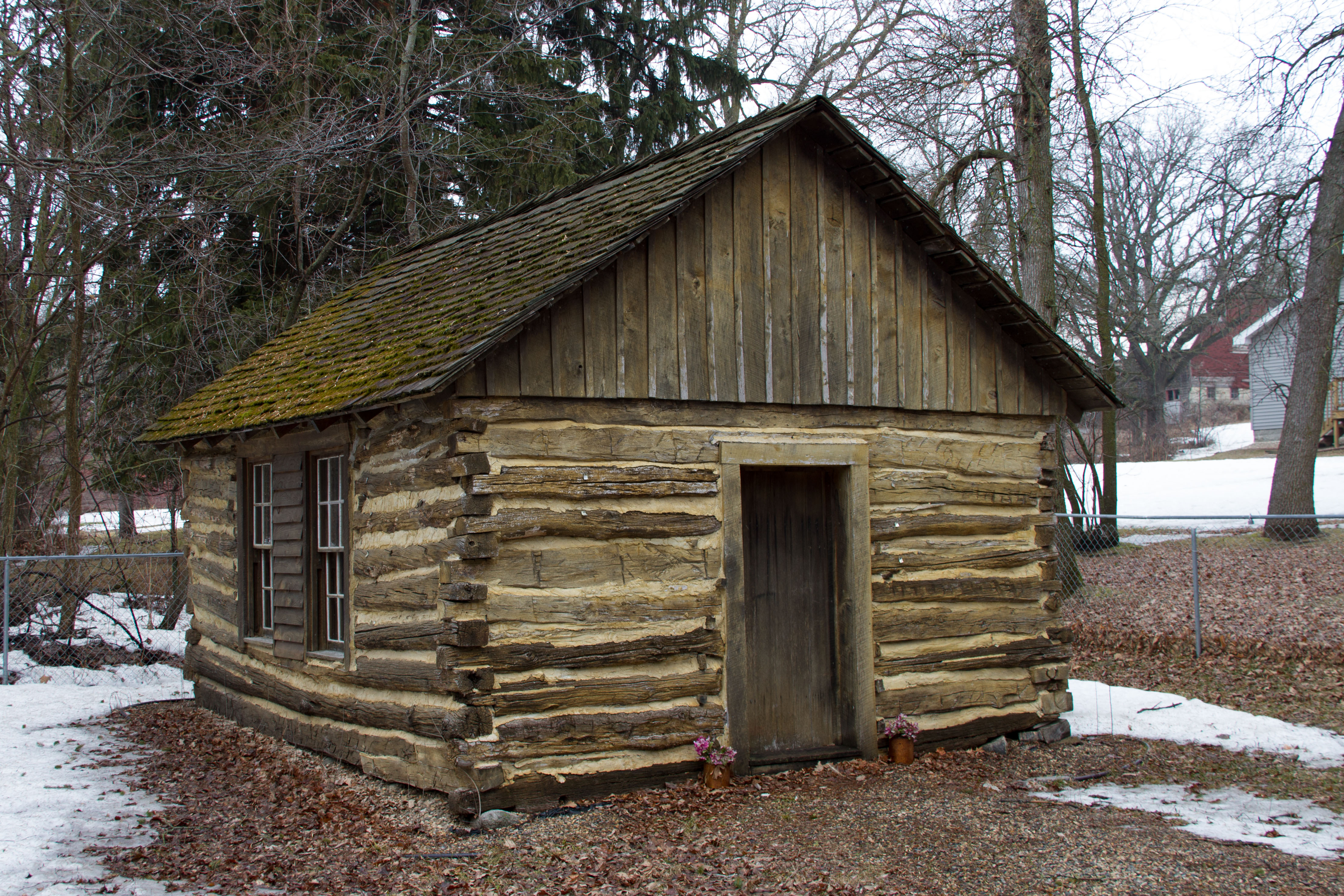
- The Urjans Iverson House, the 1866 log cabin of a Norwegian immigrant, was also used to host school and church services and listed on the National Register of Historic Places.

- Location within the state of Minnesota
- Coordinates: 45°26′54″N 95°20′32″W
- Country: United States
- State: Minnesota
- County: Pope

Area
  - Total: 92.0 km^{2} (35.5 sq mi)
  - Land: 83.1 km^{2} (32.1 sq mi)
  - Water: 8.9 km^{2} (3.4 sq mi)
- Elevation: 367 m (1,204 ft)

Population (2000)
  - Total: 239
  - Density: 2.9/km^{2} (7.5/sq mi)
- Time zone: UTC-6 (Central (CST))
  - Summer (DST): UTC-5 (CDT)
- FIPS code: 27-23750
- GNIS feature ID: 0664269

Gilchrist Township is a township in Pope County, Minnesota, United States. The population was 213 at the 2020 census.

== History ==
The township was originally surveyed in 1856. It was organized in 1866. The name "Gilchrist" comes from the first syllables of the last names of two of the early settlers: Ole Gilbertson and Gunder Christopherson. Peter Reque was the first minister, coming to Gilchrist in 1869.

== Geography ==
According to the United States Census Bureau, the township has a total area of 92.0 square kilometres (35.52 mi^{2}), of which 83.1 km^{2} (32.09 mi^{2}) is land and 9.0 km^{2} (3.47 mi^{2}) is water (9.74%).

== Demographics ==
As of the census of 2000, there were 239 people, 99 households, and 73 families residing in the township. The population density was 7.4 inhabitants per square mile (2.9/km^{2}). There were 269 housing units at an average density of 8.4 per square mile (3.2/km^{2}). The racial makeup of the township was 100.00% White.

There were 99 households, out of which 25.3% had children under the age of 18 living with them, 70.7% were married couples living together, 1.0% had a female householder with no husband present, and 25.3% were non-families. 23.2% of all households were made up of individuals, and 9.1% had someone living alone who was 65 years of age or older. The average household size was 2.41 and the average family size was 2.85.

In the township the population was spread out, with 24.7% under the age of 18, 3.3% from 18 to 24, 24.3% from 25 to 44, 24.3% from 45 to 64, and 23.4% who were 65 years of age or older. The median age was 44 years. For every 100 females, there were 102.5 males. For every 100 females age 18 and over, there were 114.3 males.

The median income for a household in the township was $38,125, and the median income for a family was $51,429. Males had a median income of $32,188 versus $26,458 for females. The per capita income for the township was $17,520. About 6.3% of families and 7.2% of the population were below the poverty line, including none of those under the age of eighteen and 13.2% of those 65 or over.
