= Glenwood Public Library (Glenwood, Minnesota) =

- U.S. National Register of Historic Places
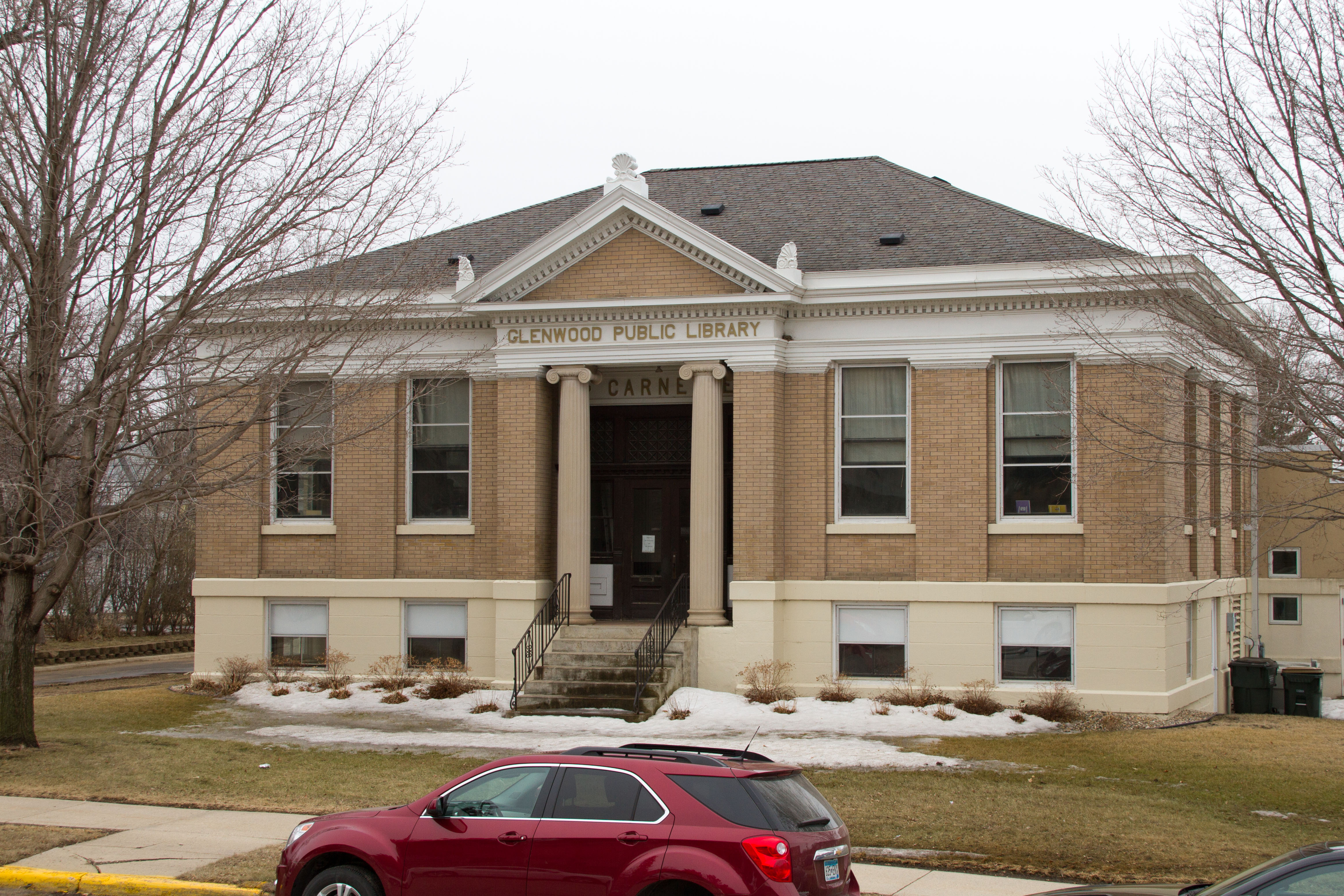
- Glenwood Public Library's north façade

- Location within Minnesota Location within the United States
- Location: 108 First Avenue; Glenwood, Minnesota
- Coordinates: 45°38′56.8″N 95°23′17.2″W
- Area: Less than one acre
- Built: 1908
- Built by: J.H. Olson
- Architect: A.S. Foss
- Architectural style: Neoclassical
- MPS: Pope County MRA
- NRHP reference No.: 82002996
- Added to NRHP: April 1, 1982

Glenwood Public Library is the public library serving the city and surrounding area of Glenwood, Minnesota, United States. The original wing of the building was constructed in 1908 as a Carnegie library and was listed on the National Register of Historic Places in 1982 for its local significance in architecture and education. It was nominated to the National Register for being one of Pope County's most architecturally distinctive buildings and its only representative of the Carnegie library phenomenon.

== See also ==
- National Register of Historic Places listings in Pope County, Minnesota
