= Little Falls station (Minnesota) =

- Northern Pacific Railway Depot
- U.S. National Register of Historic Places
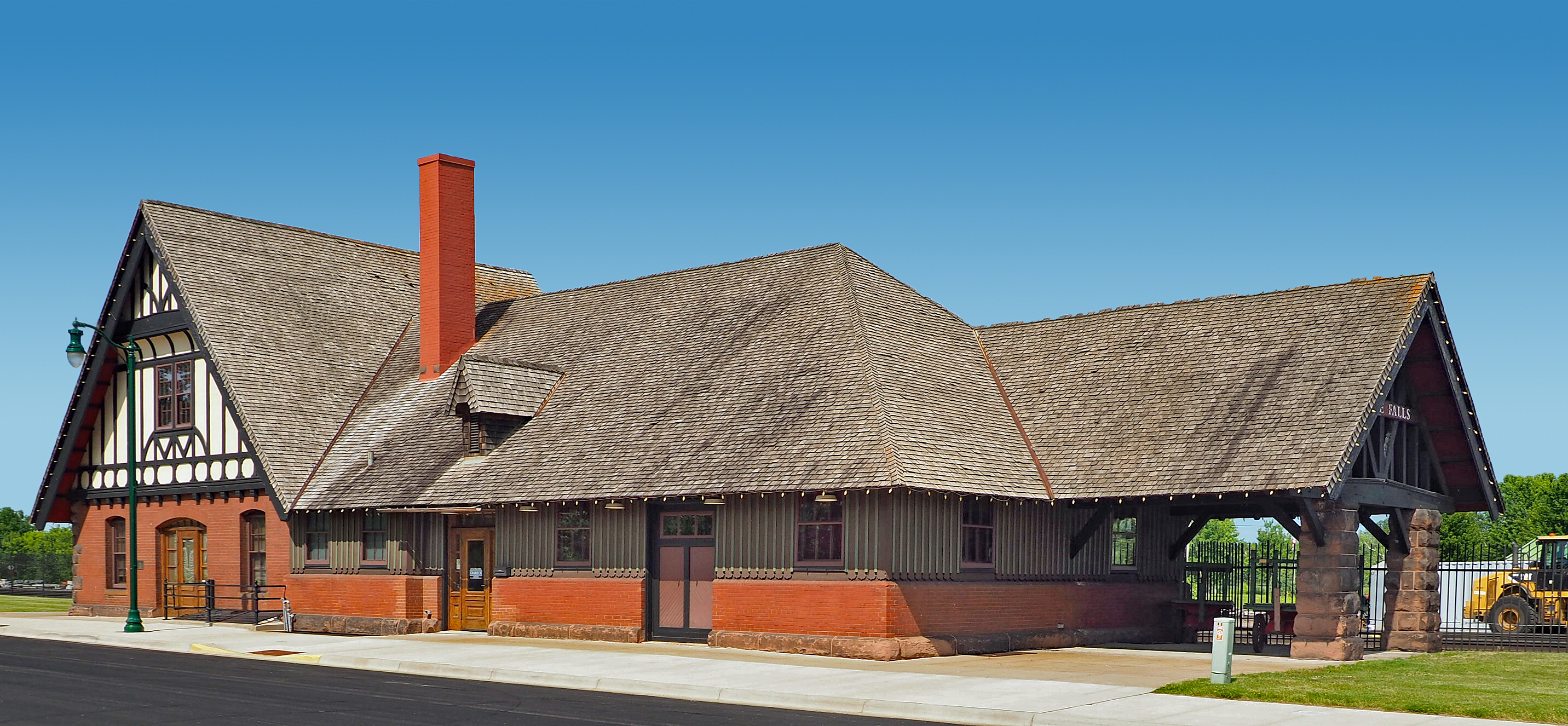
- The Little Falls Depot from the southwest

- Location within Minnesota Location within the United States
- Location: Little Falls, Minnesota
- Coordinates: 45°58′41.85″N 94°22′10.76″W
- Built: 1899
- Architect: Cass Gilbert
- Architectural style: Shingle Style
- NRHP reference No.: 85001987
- Added to NRHP: September 5, 1985

The Northern Pacific Railway Depot in Little Falls, Minnesota, United States, is a depot designed by notable architect Cass Gilbert in 1899. It was listed on the National Register of Historic Places in 1985.

Gilbert was a prominent architect in Minnesota, having designed the Minnesota State Capitol and other buildings. The Little Falls depot was one of Cass Gilbert's last works before he moved east to New York City. In 1899, the Northern Pacific Railway hired Gilbert to design a depot at a cost not exceeding $7,000. The depot, built of sandstone, wood, and brick, mixed the Shingle Style and American Craftsman style of architecture. The steeply pitched roof was originally covered with cedar shingles. The depot was in use until 1979, when a fire broke out and damaged the roof and the ladies' waiting room. A local community group acquired the building and renovated the building. It now houses the Little Falls Chamber of Commerce.

Preceding station	Northern Pacific Railway	Following station
Darling toward Seattle or Tacoma	Main Line	Royalton toward St. Paul
Flensburg toward Morris	Morris Branch	Terminus
Terminus	Little Falls – International Falls (via Minnesota and International Railway)	Brainerd toward International Falls
