= Starbuck, Minnesota =

City in Minnesota, United States

- City
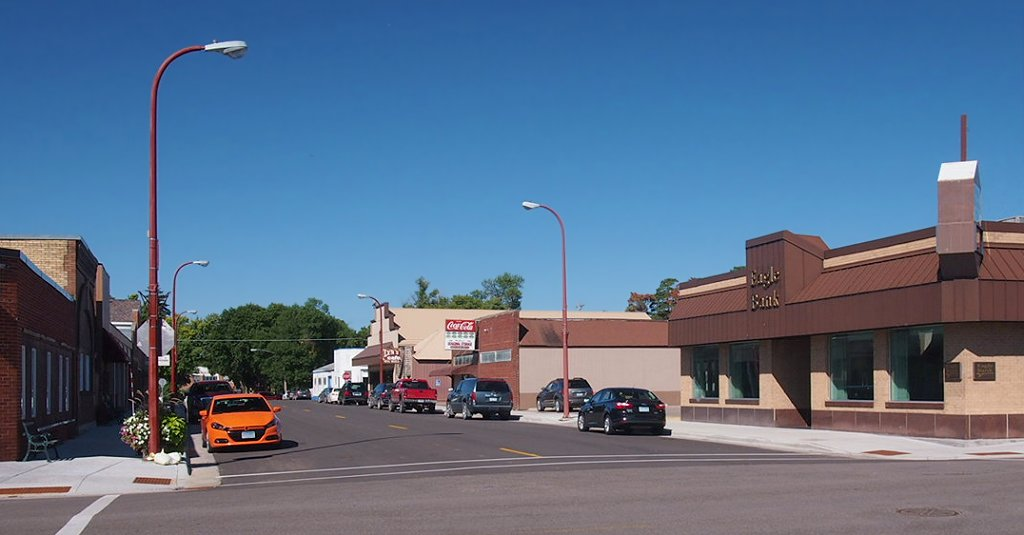
- Starbuck, Minnesota

- Location of Starbuck, Minnesota
- Coordinates: 45°36′42″N 95°31′56″W
- Country: United States
- State: Minnesota
- County: Pope
- Platted: Spring of 1882
- Incorporated: June 6, 1883

Government
  - Mayor: Gary E. Swenson

Area
  - Total: 1.480 sq mi (3.833 km^{2})
  - Land: 1.480 sq mi (3.833 km^{2})
  - Water: 0 sq mi (0.000 km^{2})
- Elevation: 1,165 ft (355 m)

Population (2020)
  - Total: 1,365
  - Estimate (2022): 1,410
  - Density: 922.3/sq mi (356.12/km^{2})
- Time zone: UTC−6 (Central (CST))
  - Summer (DST): UTC−5 (CDT)
- ZIP Code: 56381
- Area code: 320
- FIPS code: 27-62500
- GNIS feature ID: 2395956
- Sales tax: 6.875%
- Website: starbuckmn.gov

Starbuck is a city in Pope County, Minnesota, United States. The population was 1,365 at the 2020 census. The city is on the western shore of Lake Minnewaska.

== Geography ==
Minnesota State Highways 28, 29, and 114 are three of Starbuck's main routes.

According to the United States Census Bureau, the city has an area of 1.48 square miles (3.83 km^{2}), all land.

== History ==
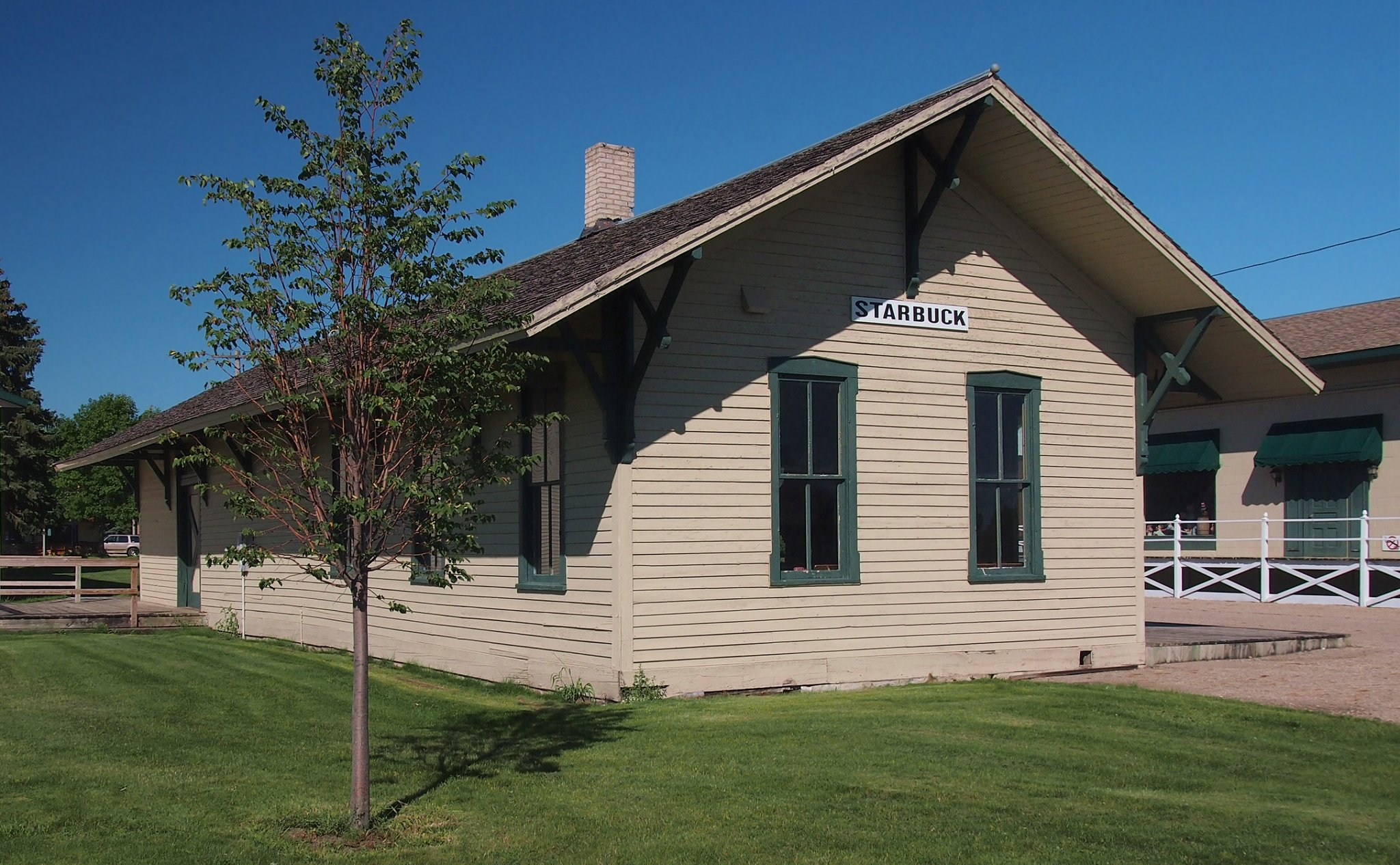
The 1882 Little Falls and Dakota Depot is now used as a museum and listed on the National Register of Historic Places

Starbuck was platted in the spring of 1882, as a village on the Northern Pacific railway, adjoining Lake Minnewaska. The growth and settlement of Pope County were greatly impeded for many years by the lack of railway and shipping facilities, which obliged settlers to go long distances into adjoining counties to market their products.

The town was reportedly named after Stabekk in Bærum in Akershus county, Norway. But Geographical Names of Manitoba says the village of Starbuck, Manitoba, is thought to have been named after the town in Minnesota by a contractor working for the Canadian Pacific Railway in 1885, and that Starbuck, Minnesota, was named after William H. Starbuck of New York, who financed the Little Falls and Dakota Railroad. Some also believe the town's name comes from the oxen used to build the railroad through the town, whose names were Star and Buck.

== Demographics ==
Historical population
Census	Pop.	Note	%±
1890	224		—
1900	469		109.4%
1910	497		6.0%
1920	824		65.8%
1930	781		−5.2%
1940	972		24.5%
1950	1,143		17.6%
1960	1,099		−3.8%
1970	1,138		3.5%
1980	1,224		7.6%
1990	1,143		−6.6%
2000	1,314		15.0%
2010	1,302		−0.9%
2020	1,365		4.8%
2022 (est.)	1,410		3.3%
U.S. Decennial Census; 2020 Census

=== 2010 census ===
As of the 2010 census, there were 1,302 people, 576 households, and 328 families living in the city. The population density was 829.3 inhabitants per square mile (320.2/km^{2}). There were 671 housing units at an average density of 427.4 per square mile (165.0/km^{2}). The racial makeup of the city was 97.3% White, 0.3% African American, 0.3% Native American, 0.8% from other races, and 1.3% from two or more races. Hispanic or Latino people of any race were 1.3% of the population.

There were 576 households, of which 22.9% had children under the age of 18 living with them, 42.5% were married couples living together, 9.9% had a female householder with no husband present, 4.5% had a male householder with no wife present, and 43.1% were non-families. 36.5% of all households were made up of individuals, and 19.5% had someone living alone who was 65 years of age or older. The average household size was 2.14 and the average family size was 2.75.

The median age in the city was 45.8 years. 19.9% of residents were under the age of 18; 8.4% were between the ages of 18 and 24; 21% were from 25 to 44; 25% were from 45 to 64; and 25.8% were 65 years of age or older. The gender makeup of the city was 48.8% male and 51.2% female.

=== 2000 census ===
As of the 2000 census, there were 1,314 people, 565 households, and 328 families living in the city. The population density was 834.0 inhabitants per square mile (322.0/km^{2}). There were 633 housing units at an average density of 401.8 per square mile (155.1/km^{2}). The racial makeup of the city was 99.01% White, 0.23% from other races, and 0.76% from two or more races. Hispanic or Latino people of any race were 0.46% of the population.

There were 565 households, of which 26.5% had children under the age of 18 living with them, 47.8% were married couples living together, 7.6% had a female householder with no husband present, and 41.9% were non-families. 38.8% of all households were made up of individuals, and 25.8% had someone living alone who was 65 years of age or older. The average household size was 2.16 and the average family size was 2.84.

In the city, the population was spread out, with 22.0% under the age of 18, 4.9% from 18 to 24, 23.1% from 25 to 44, 19.2% from 45 to 64, and 30.9% who were 65 years of age or older. The median age was 45. For every 100 females, there were 82.0 males. For every 100 females 18 and over, there were 76.7 males.

The median income for a household in the city was $28,235, and the median income for a family was $40,875. Males had a median income of $30,865 versus $21,184 for females. The per capita income for the city was $15,030. About 7.9% of families and 13.1% of the population were below the poverty line, including 11.5% of those under age 18 and 23.6% of those age 65 or over.
