= Villard, Minnesota =

City in Minnesota, United States

Villard
- City
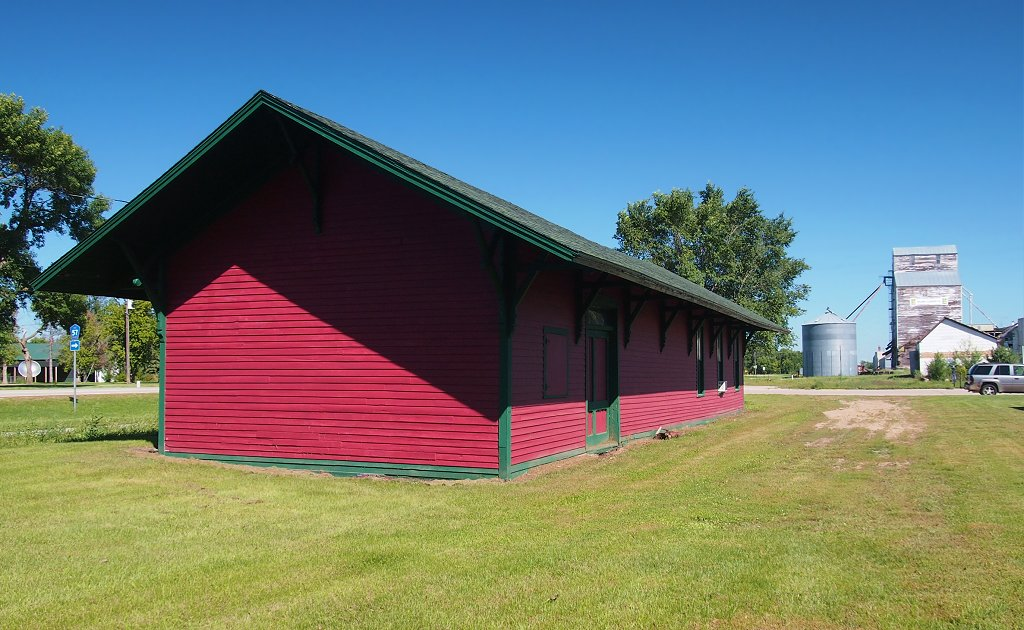
- Villard's historic railway station and a grain elevator

- Location of Villard, Minnesota
- Coordinates: 45°42′49″N 95°16′09″W
- Country: United States
- State: Minnesota
- County: Pope
- Founded: 1882

Area
  - Total: 0.85 sq mi (2.21 km^{2})
  - Land: 0.85 sq mi (2.20 km^{2})
  - Water: 0 sq mi (0.00 km^{2})
- Elevation: 1,365 ft (416 m)

Population (2020)
  - Total: 225
  - Estimate (2021): 224
  - Density: 264.5/sq mi (102.13/km^{2})
- Time zone: UTC-6 (Central)
  - Summer (DST): UTC-5 (CDT)
- ZIP code: 56385
- Area code: 320
- FIPS code: 27-67144
- GNIS feature ID: 2397141

Villard is a city in Pope County, Minnesota, United States. The population was 225 at the 2020 census.

== History ==
Villard was platted in 1882, and named for Henry Villard, a railroad official. A post office has been in operation at Villard since 1882.

== Geography ==
According to the United States Census Bureau, the city has a total area of 0.80 square miles (2.07 km^{2}), all land.

Minnesota State Highway 28 serves as a main route in the community.

== Demographics ==
Historical population
| Census | Pop. | Note | %± |
|---|---|---|---|
| 1890 | 203 | | — |
| 1900 | 249 | | 22.7% |
| 1910 | 260 | | 4.4% |
| 1920 | 308 | | 18.5% |
| 1930 | 234 | | −24.0% |
| 1940 | 248 | | 6.0% |
| 1950 | 288 | | 16.1% |
| 1960 | 235 | | −18.4% |
| 1970 | 221 | | −6.0% |
| 1980 | 275 | | 24.4% |
| 1990 | 247 | | −10.2% |
| 2000 | 244 | | −1.2% |
| 2010 | 254 | | 4.1% |
| 2020 | 225 | | −11.4% |
| 2021 (est.) | 224 | | −0.4% |
U.S. Decennial Census; 2020 Census

=== 2010 census ===
As of the census of 2010, there were 254 people, 115 households, and 72 families living in the city. The population density was 317.5 inhabitants per square mile (122.6/km^{2}). There were 127 housing units at an average density of 158.8 per square mile (61.3/km^{2}). The racial makeup of the city was 95.7% White, 2.0% Native American, 0.8% Asian, and 1.6% from two or more races. Hispanic or Latino of any race were 0.4% of the population.

There were 115 households, of which 24.3% had children under the age of 18 living with them, 50.4% were married couples living together, 9.6% had a female householder with no husband present, 2.6% had a male householder with no wife present, and 37.4% were non-families. 33.0% of all households were made up of individuals, and 13.1% had someone living alone who was 65 years of age or older. The average household size was 2.21 and the average family size was 2.79.

The median age in the city was 45.3 years. 22.4% of residents were under the age of 18; 6.3% were between the ages of 18 and 24; 20.8% were from 25 to 44; 31.6% were from 45 to 64; and 18.9% were 65 years of age or older. The gender makeup of the city was 49.6% male and 50.4% female.

=== 2000 census ===
As of the census of 2000, there were 244 people, 99 households, and 68 families living in the city. The population density was 308.5 inhabitants per square mile (119.1/km^{2}). There were 116 housing units at an average density of 146.7 per square mile (56.6/km^{2}). The racial makeup of the city was 98.36% White, 0.41% Native American, 0.82% Asian, and 0.41% from two or more races.

There were 99 households, out of which 34.3% had children under the age of 18 living with them, 56.6% were married couples living together, 11.1% had a female householder with no husband present, and 31.3% were non-families. 26.3% of all households were made up of individuals, and 15.2% had someone living alone who was 65 years of age or older. The average household size was 2.46 and the average family size was 3.04.

In the city, the population was spread out, with 26.6% under the age of 18, 6.1% from 18 to 24, 22.1% from 25 to 44, 24.6% from 45 to 64, and 20.5% who were 65 years of age or older. The median age was 43 years. For every 100 females, there were 92.1 males. For every 100 females age 18 and over, there were 86.5 males.

The median income for a household in the city was $24,688, and the median income for a family was $33,214. Males had a median income of $25,156 versus $15,357 for females. The per capita income for the city was $14,154. About 12.2% of families and 18.3% of the population were below the poverty line, including 30.2% of those under the age of eighteen and 16.0% of those 65 or over.
