= National Register of Historic Places listings in Pope County, Minnesota =

Location of Pope County in Minnesota

This is a list of the National Register of Historic Places listings in Pope County, Minnesota. It is intended to be a complete list of the properties and districts on the National Register of Historic Places in Pope County, Minnesota, United States. The locations of National Register properties and districts for which the latitude and longitude coordinates are included below, may be seen in an online map.

There are 11 properties and districts listed on the National Register in the county. A supplementary list includes three additional sites that were formerly on the National Register.

This National Park Service list is complete through NPS recent listings posted August 1, 2025.

== Current listings ==
| | Name on the Register | Image | Date listed | Location | City or town | Description |
|---|---|---|---|---|---|---|
| 1 | Ann Bickle House | Ann Bickle House | March 28, 1997 (#97000284) | 226 E. Minnesota Ave. 45°39′00″N 95°23′08″W | Glenwood | Home from 1936 to her death of civic leader Ann Bickle (1886–1984), heavily involved in local and state cultural organizations, public health efforts, and wartime homefront preparations. Now a community center. |
| 2 | Fremad Association Building | Fremad Association Building | April 1, 1982 (#82002995) | 2-22 S. Franklin; 45°38′58″N 95°23′25″W | Glenwood | 1919 building of a mercantile cooperative and adjacent 1908 Neoclassical bank, together a hub of local commerce into the mid-20th century. Demolished in September 2023. |
| 3 | Glenwood Public Library | Glenwood Public Library | April 1, 1982 (#82002996) | 108 1st Ave. 45°38′57″N 95°23′17″W | Glenwood | 1908 Neoclassical library, one of Pope County's most architecturally distinctive buildings and its only Carnegie library. |
| 4 | Urjans Iverson House | Urjans Iverson House | February 11, 1982 (#82003001) | 31039 Minnesota Highway 104; 45°27′13″N 95°15′20″W | Sedan vicinity | 1866 log cabin associated with the early settlement of Pope County, including its construction from timbers of a short-lived military outpost built after the Dakota War of 1862 and use as a schoolhouse and church beginning in 1869. |
| 5 | Little Falls and Dakota Depot | Little Falls and Dakota Depot | May 24, 2006 (#06000424) | Depot Ln. 45°36′42″N 95°31′50″W | Starbuck | 1882 train station associated with the expansion of rail lines and European settlement into the region, and the growth of Starbuck as an agricultural trade center. |
| 6 | Northern Pacific Depot | Northern Pacific Depot | October 6, 1983 (#83003760) | Off Washington Ave. 45°42′56″N 95°16′10″W | Villard | 1882 railway station associated with the founding of Villard along a new Northern Pacific Railway line. |
| 7 | Daniel Pennie House | Daniel Pennie House | April 1, 1982 (#82003003) | County Highway 27; 45°43′56″N 95°16′36″W | Villard vicinity | House of a prominent Pope County settler (1832–1917), built sometime in the 1870s or 80s using a construction method rare in Minnesota: fieldstone covered over with grout. |
| 8 | Pope County Courthouse | Pope County Courthouse | April 1, 1982 (#82002997) | 130 E. Minnesota Ave. 45°38′59″N 95°23′16″W | Glenwood | 1930 Beaux-Arts courthouse, long-serving seat of Pope County government and a well-preserved example of that decade's replacements for earlier county courthouses. |
| 9 | Sunset Beach Hotel | Sunset Beach Hotel | February 11, 1982 (#82002998) | 20000 S. Lakeshore Dr. 45°36′51″N 95°24′40″W | Glenwood vicinity | One of west-central Minnesota's best preserved early resorts, with three buildings constructed 1915, 1927, and 1930 at a longstanding focal point for recreation on Lake Minnewaska. |
| 10 | Terrace Historic District | Terrace Historic District | April 1, 1982 (#82002999) | Off Minnesota Highway 104; 45°30′42″N 95°19′16″W | Terrace | Well-preserved example of the small communities that grew up around Minnesota's rural mills in the latter 19th century, with 13 contributing properties built 1870s–1930 including a church, school, general store, mill, and houses. |
| 11 | Terrace Mill Historic District | Terrace Mill Historic District | July 17, 1979 (#79001252) | Off Minnesota Highway 104; 45°30′39″N 95°19′15″W | Terrace | 1903 flour mill and four other structures built 1882–1930, exemplifying the small, rural milling operations once common in Minnesota. Also all contributing properties to the Terrace Historic District. Now a non-profit historic attraction. |

== Former listings ==
| | Name on the Register | Image | Date listed | Date removed | Location | City or town | Description |
|---|---|---|---|---|---|---|---|
| 1 | Lakeside Pavilion | Lakeside Pavilion | December 4, 1998 (#98001444) | January 2, 2004 | S. Lakeshore Dr. and First Ave. SW | Glenwood | 1909 dance pavilion. Burned in 2003, rebuilt as a modern structure in 2007. |
| 2 | Lowry Public School | Lowry Public School | April 1, 1982 (#82003000) | June 7, 1993 | Florence Ave. and Maple St. | Lowry | 1902 school. Demolished in 1992. |
| 3 | Minnewaska Hospital | Minnewaska Hospital | April 1, 1982 (#82003002) | January 31, 2019 | Wollan and 5th Sts. | Starbuck | Hospital clinic built 1899–1900 for notable local doctor C. R. Christenson (1867–1940). Demolished in January 2013. |

== See also ==
- List of National Historic Landmarks in Minnesota
- National Register of Historic Places listings in Minnesota
